= Canton of Montlieu-la-Garde =

Coordinates: 45°15′N 0°16′W

Montlieu-la-Garde
- Former canton
- Interactive map of Montlieu-la-Garde
- Country: France
- Region: Nouvelle-Aquitaine
- Department: Charente-Maritime
- No. of communes: {{{nbcomm}}}
- Disbanded: 2015
- Area: 218.88 km^{2} (84.51 sq mi)
- Population (2012): 6,813
  - Density: 31.13/km^{2} (80.62/sq mi)

The Canton of Montlieu-la-Garde is a former canton of the Charente-Maritime department, in France. It was disbanded following the French canton reorganisation which came into effect in March 2015. It consisted of 13 communes, which joined the new canton of Les Trois Monts in 2015. It had 6,813 inhabitants (2012). The lowest point is about 50 m in the commune of Bussac-Forêt, the highest point is Chevanceaux at 158 m, and the average elevation is 98 m. The most populous commune was Montlieu-la-Garde with 1,329 residents (2012).

== Communes ==
The canton comprised the following communes:

- Bedenac
- Bussac-Forêt
- Chatenet
- Chepniers
- Chevanceaux
- Mérignac
- Montlieu-la-Garde
- Orignolles
- Le Pin
- Polignac
- Pouillac
- Sainte-Colombe
- Saint-Palais-de-Négrignac

== Population history ==
Year	Population
1962	5,958
1968	6,603
1972	6,322
1982	6,138
1990	6,212
1999	6,153
2012	6,813

== See also ==
- Cantons of the Charente-Maritime department
