= Allas-Champagne =

- Commune
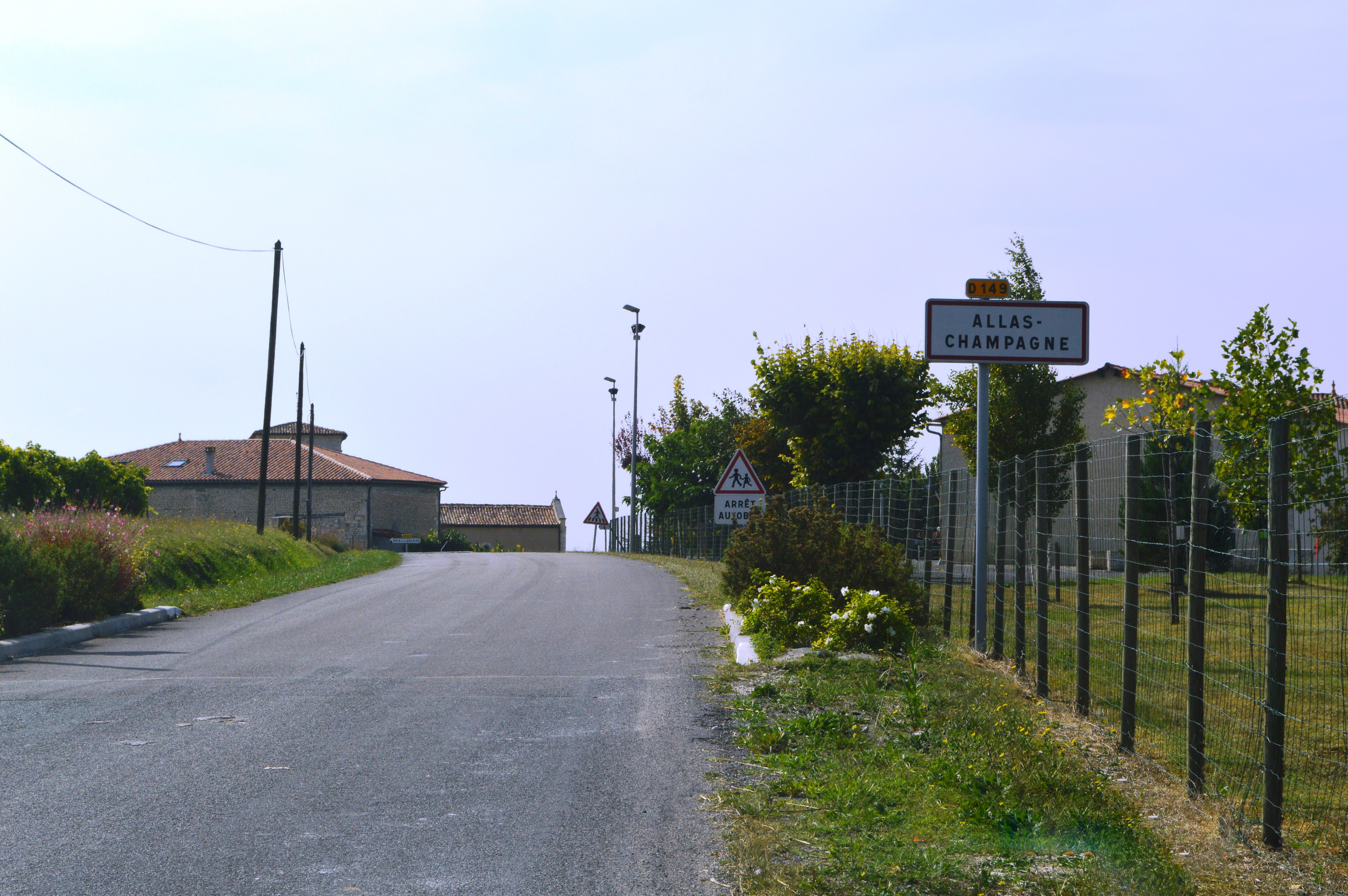
- The road into Allas-Champagne

- Coat of arms
- Location of Allas-Champagne
- Location within France Location within Nouvelle-Aquitaine
- Coordinates: 45°28′15″N 0°20′20″W
- Country: France
- Region: Nouvelle-Aquitaine
- Department: Charente-Maritime
- Arrondissement: Jonzac
- Canton: Jonzac
- Intercommunality: Haute Saintonge

Government
  - Mayor (2020–2026): Bernard Maindron
- Area^{1}: 7.65 km^{2} (2.95 sq mi)
- Elevation: 67 m (220 ft)
- Highest elevation: 77 m (253 ft)
- Lowest elevation: 35 m (115 ft)
- Population (2023): 283
  - Density: 37.0/km^{2} (95.8/sq mi)
- Time zone: UTC+01:00 (CET)
  - Summer (DST): UTC+02:00 (CEST)
- INSEE/Postal code: 17006 /17500
- ^{1} French Land Register data, which excludes lakes, ponds, glaciers > 1 km^{2} (0.386 sq mi or 247 acres) and river estuaries.

Allas-Champagne is a commune in the Charente-Maritime department in the Nouvelle-Aquitaine region of southwestern France.

== Geography ==
Allas-Champagne is located in the south of the department of Charente-Maritime in the former province of Saintonge some 10 km north-east of Jonzac and 5 km south-east of Archiac. It can be accessed by road D250 which comes east from the D699 linking Jonzac and Archiac through the village and continuing east as the D250E1 to Brie-sous-Archiac. There is also the D149 which comes from Archiac in the north passing through the heart of the commune and the village and continuing south to join the D2 road west of Meux. Apart from the village there are three hamlets in the commune: Godais, Chez Gondre, and La Valade. The commune consists entirely of farmland with the exception of a few very small patches of forest in the south.

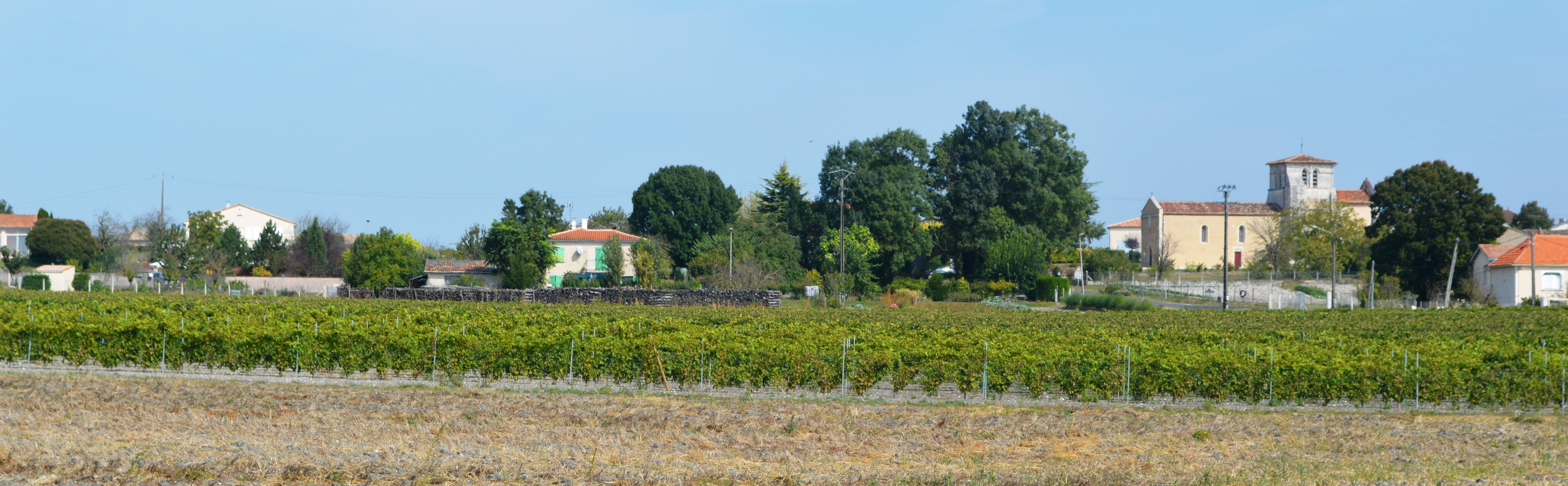
Panorama of Allas-Champagne

The Trefle river flows west through the south of the commune forming part of the southern border before continuing westwards to join the Seugne near Saint-Grégoire-d'Ardennes. A small unnamed stream also rises in the north of the commune and flows west then south to join the Trefle.

== Administration ==
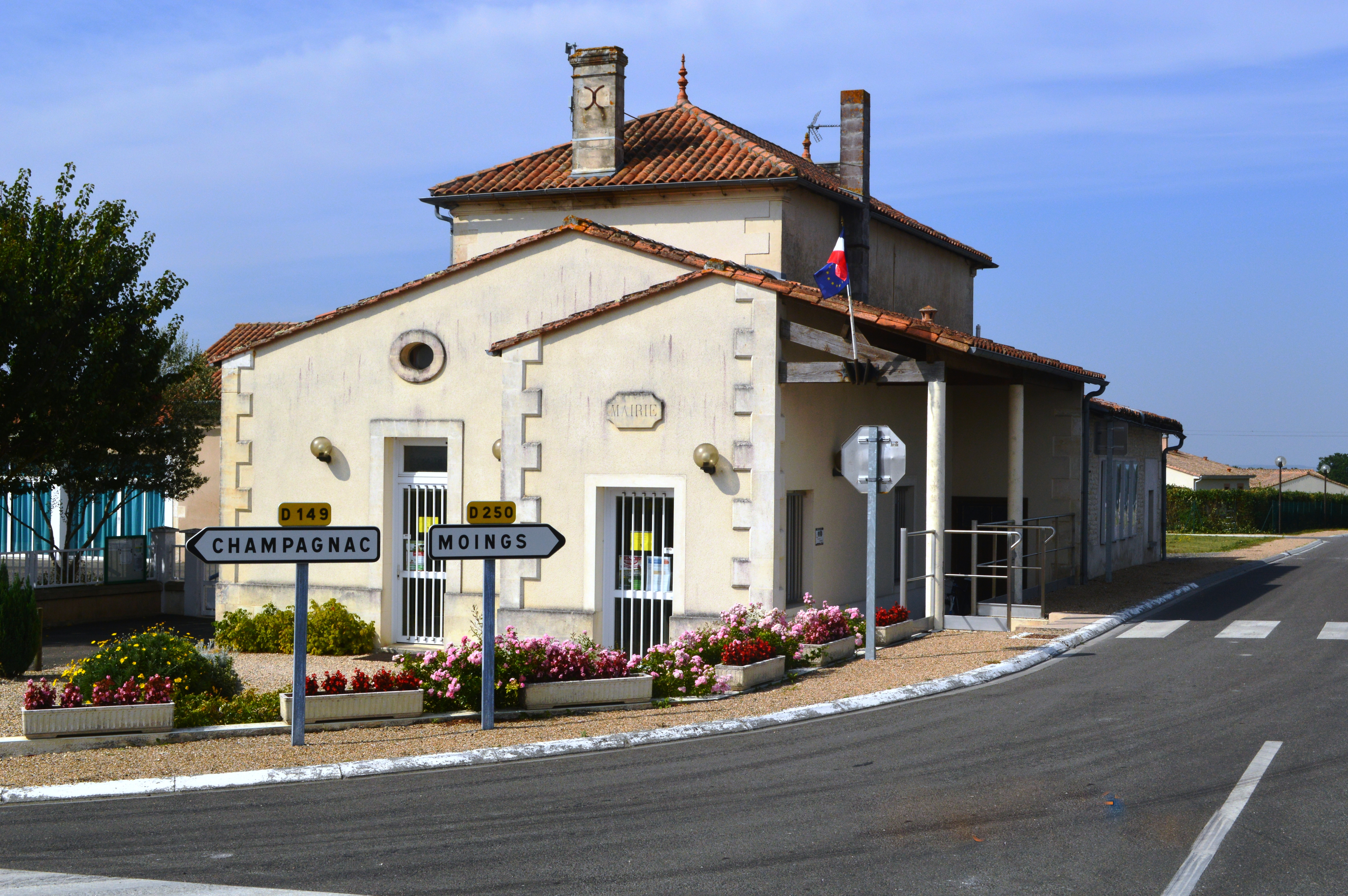
The Town Hall

List of Successive Mayors

From	To	Name	Party	Position
2001	2014	Yves Guénoux	SE	Sales Executive
2014	2026	Bernard Maindron		

== Population ==
The inhabitants of the commune are known as Allasiens or Allasiennes in French.

Historical population
Year	Pop.	±% p.a.
1968	201	—
1975	200	−0.07%
1982	213	+0.90%
1990	207	−0.36%
1999	184	−1.30%
2007	229	+2.77%
2012	272	+3.50%
2017	264	−0.60%
2023	283	+1.17%
Source: INSEE

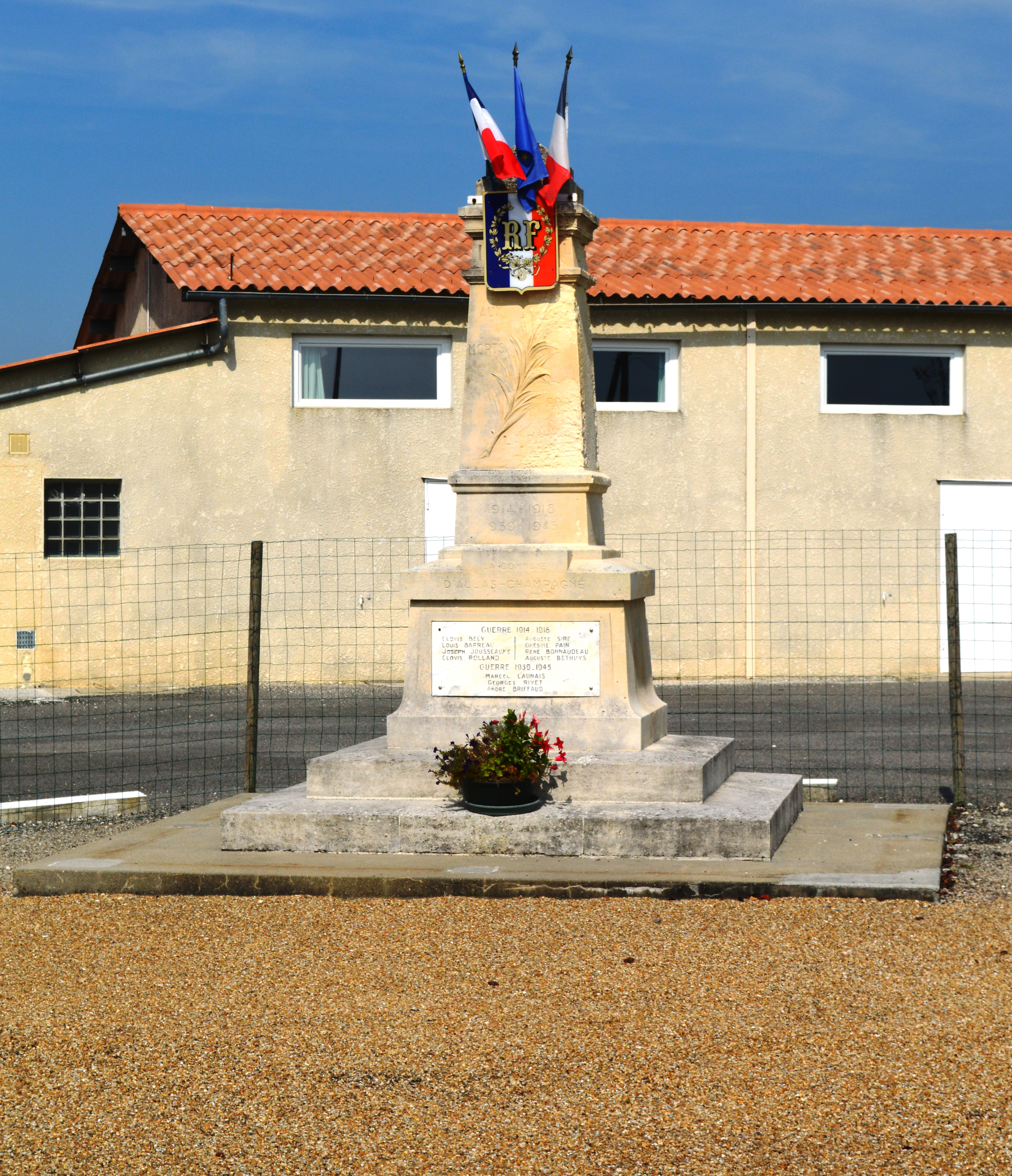
Allas-Champagne War Memorial

== Education ==
A public kindergarten is located in the centre of the village.

== Sites and monuments ==
- The Church of Saint-Didier from the 12th century.
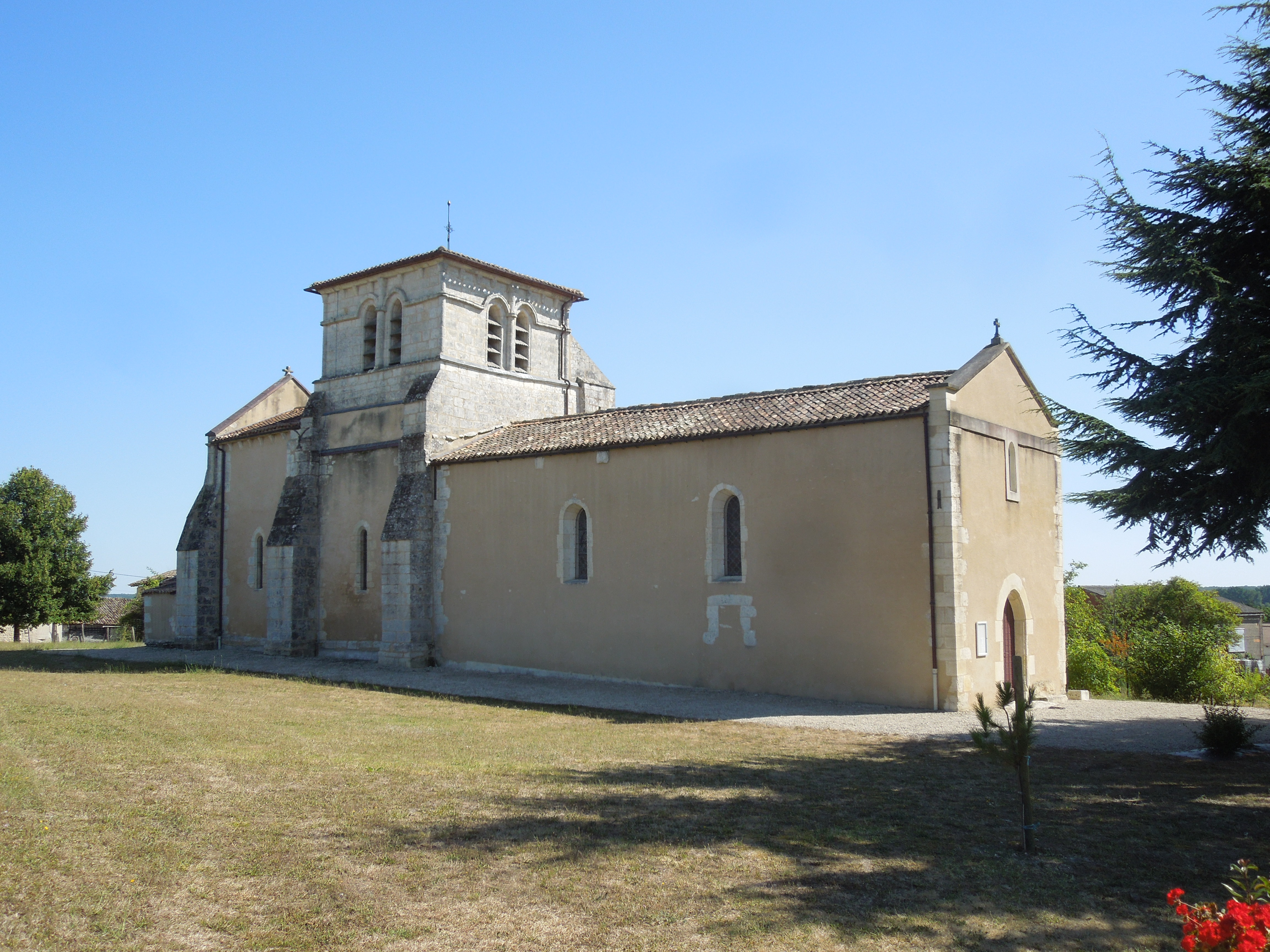
The Church of Saint Didier

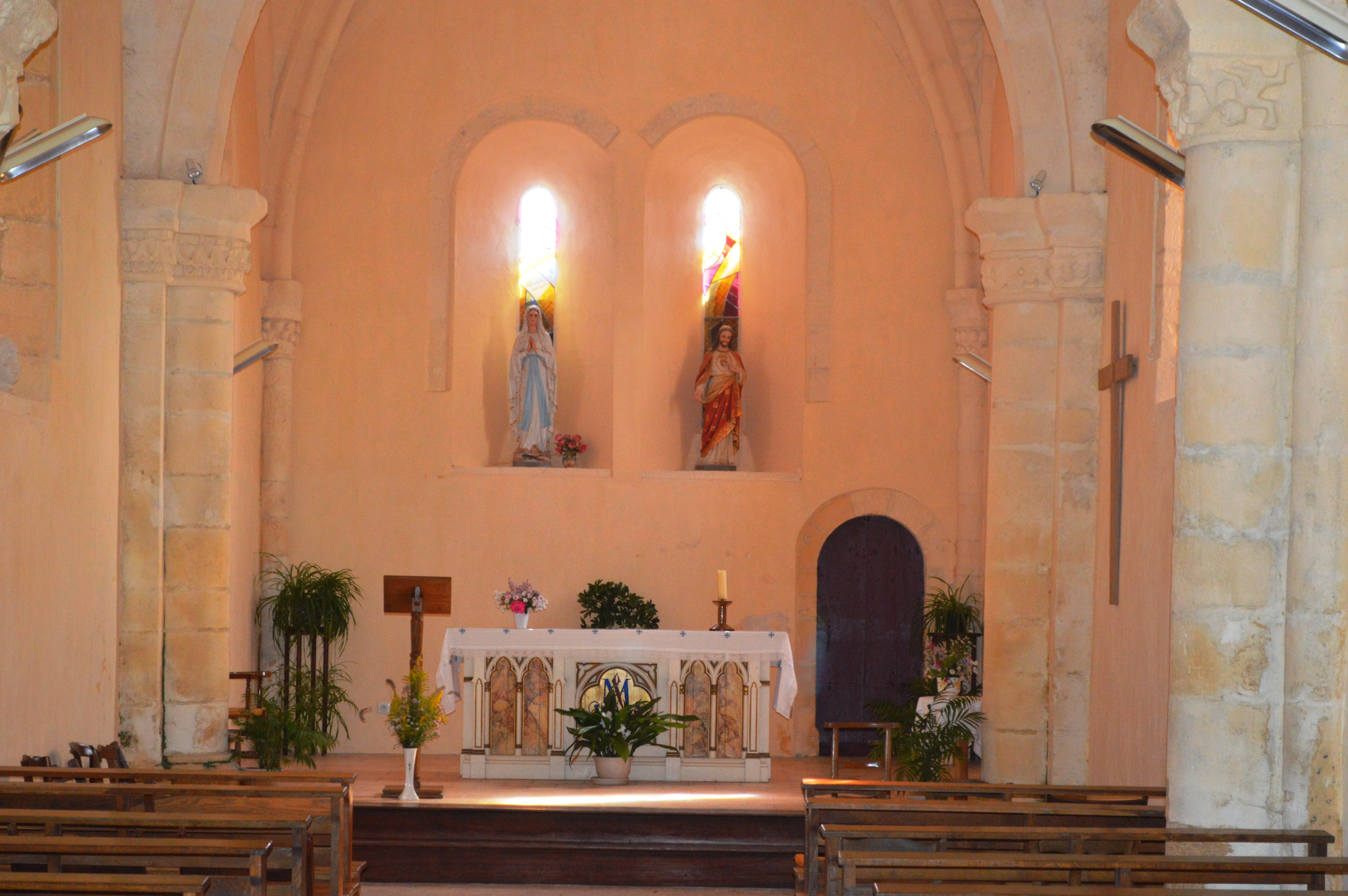
Church of Saint Didier Interior

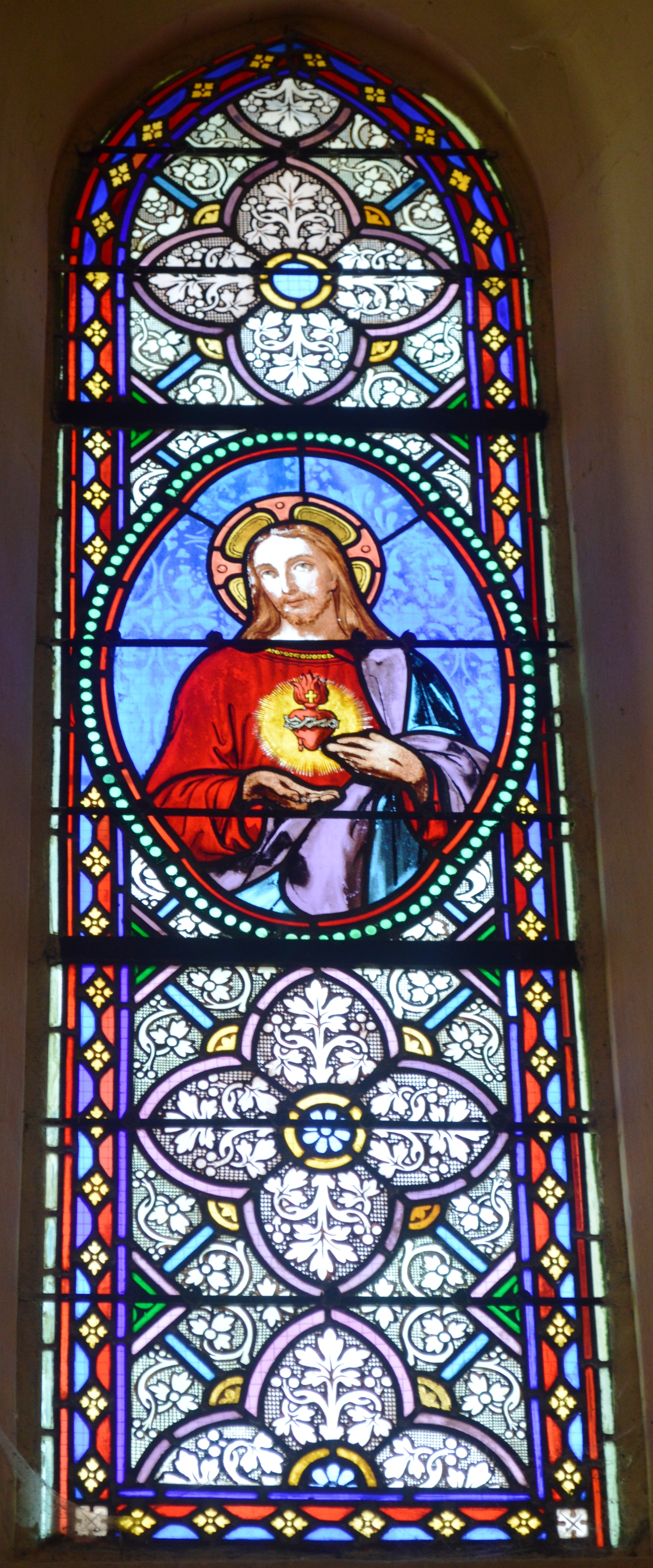
Stained Glass in the Church

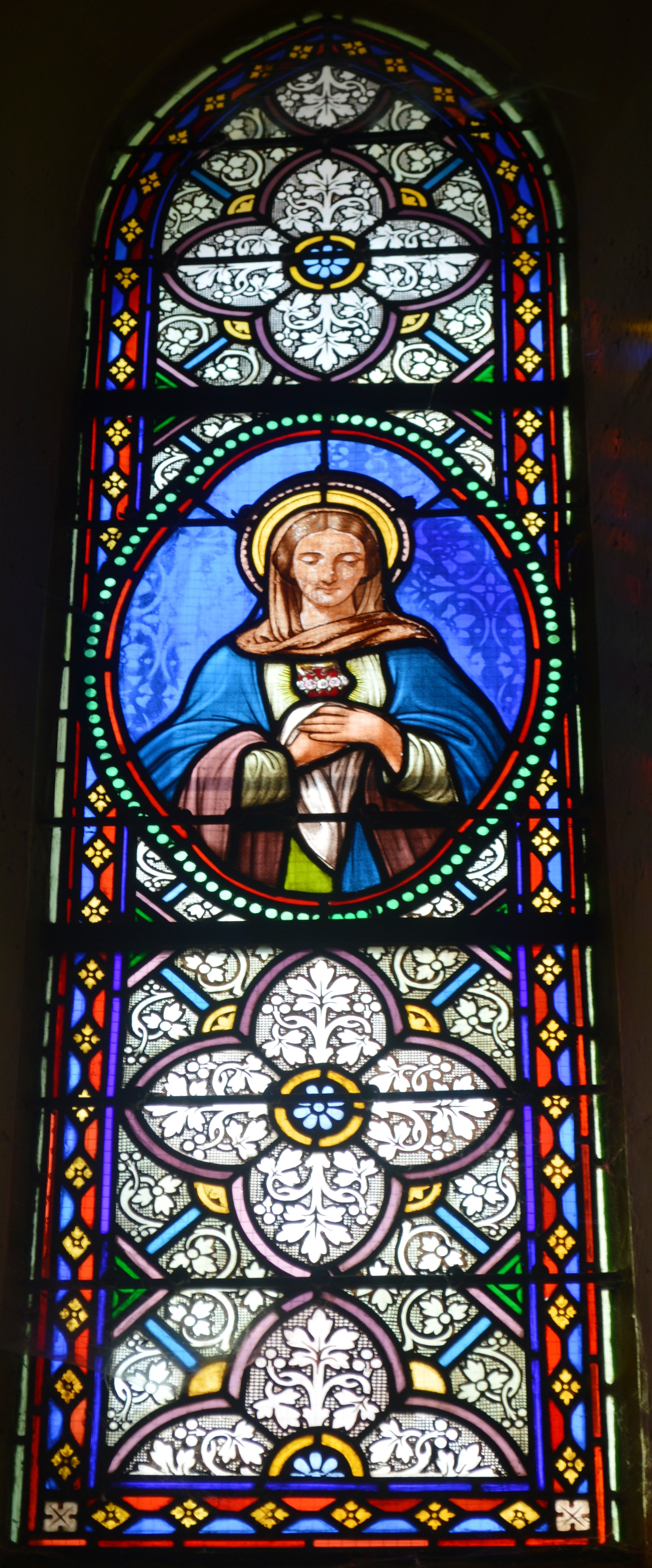
Stained Glass in the Church

== Transport ==
=== Nearest Railway stations and halts ===
- Jonzac (9 km)
- Fontaines-d'Ozillac (halt) (9.9 km)
- Clion-sur-Seugne (halt) (13.1 km)
- Pons (20 km)
- Montendre (21.6 km)

=== Nearest Airports and airfields ===
- Cognac (21 km)
- Angoulême (52.1 km)
- Aerodrome of Royan-Médis (52.7 km)

== See also ==
- Communes of the Charente-Maritime department
