= Arrondissement of Jonzac =

Coordinates: 45.45°N 0.43°W

Jonzac
- Arrondissement
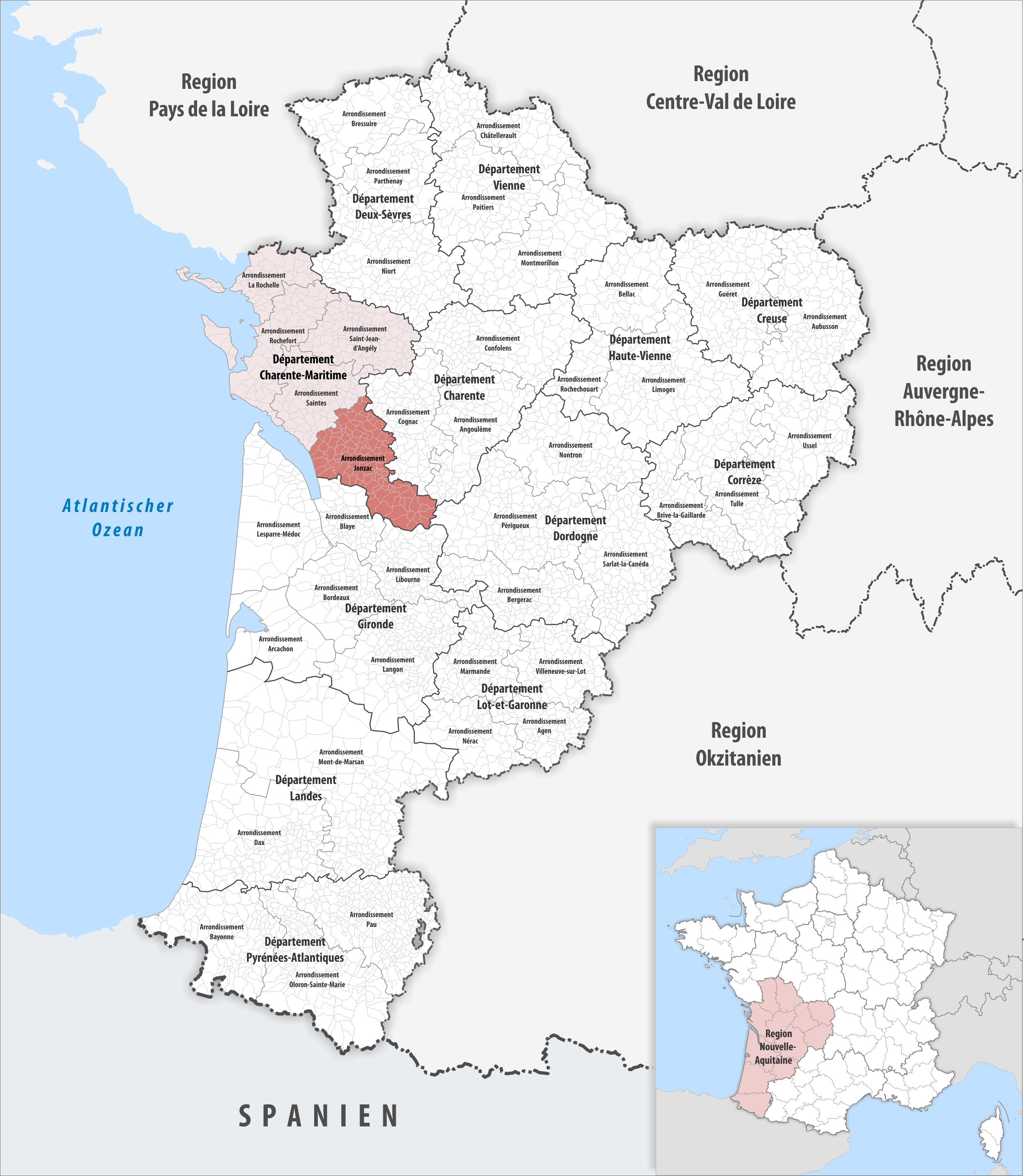
- Location within the region Nouvelle-Aquitaine
- Country: France
- Region: Nouvelle-Aquitaine
- Department: Charente-Maritime
- No. of communes: {{{nbcomm}}}
- Area: 1,740.1 km^{2} (671.9 sq mi)
- Population (2023): 69,164
  - Density: 39.747/km^{2} (102.94/sq mi)
- INSEE code: 171

The arrondissement of Jonzac is an arrondissement of France in the Charente-Maritime department in the Nouvelle-Aquitaine region. It has 129 communes. Its population is 68,476 (2021), and its area is 1,740.1 km^{2} (671.9 sq mi).

== Composition ==
The communes of the arrondissement of Jonzac, and their INSEE codes, are:

1. Agudelle (17002)
2. Allas-Bocage (17005)
3. Allas-Champagne (17006)
4. Archiac (17016)
5. Arthenac (17020)
6. Avy (17027)
7. La Barde (17033)
8. Bedenac (17038)
9. Belluire (17039)
10. Biron (17047)
11. Bois (17050)
12. Boisredon (17052)
13. Boresse-et-Martron (17054)
14. Boscamnant (17055)
15. Bougneau (17056)
16. Bran (17061)
17. Brie-sous-Archiac (17066)
18. Brives-sur-Charente (17069)
19. Bussac-Forêt (17074)
20. Celles (17076)
21. Cercoux (17077)
22. Chadenac (17078)
23. Chamouillac (17081)
24. Champagnac (17082)
25. Champagnolles (17084)
26. Chartuzac (17092)
27. Chatenet (17095)
28. Chaunac (17096)
29. Chepniers (17099)
30. Chevanceaux (17104)
31. Cierzac (17106)
32. Clam (17108)
33. Clérac (17110)
34. Clion (17111)
35. La Clotte (17113)
36. Consac (17116)
37. Corignac (17118)
38. Coulonges (17122)
39. Courpignac (17129)
40. Coux (17130)
41. Échebrune (17145)
42. Expiremont (17156)
43. Fléac-sur-Seugne (17159)
44. Fontaines-d'Ozillac (17163)
45. Le Fouilloux (17167)
46. La Genétouze (17173)
47. Germignac (17175)
48. Givrezac (17178)
49. Guitinières (17187)
50. Jarnac-Champagne (17192)
51. Jonzac (17197)
52. Jussas (17199)
53. Léoville (17204)
54. Lonzac (17209)
55. Lorignac (17210)
56. Lussac (17215)
57. Marignac (17220)
58. Mazerolles (17227)
59. Mérignac (17229)
60. Messac (17231)
61. Meux (17233)
62. Mirambeau (17236)
63. Montendre (17240)
64. Montguyon (17241)
65. Montlieu-la-Garde (17243)
66. Mortiers (17249)
67. Mosnac (17250)
68. Neuillac (17258)
69. Neulles (17259)
70. Neuvicq (17260)
71. Nieul-le-Virouil (17263)
72. Orignolles (17269)
73. Ozillac (17270)
74. Pérignac (17273)
75. Le Pin (17276)
76. Plassac (17279)
77. Polignac (17281)
78. Pommiers-Moulons (17282)
79. Pons (17283)
80. Pouillac (17287)
81. Réaux-sur-Trèfle (17295)
82. Rouffignac (17305)
83. Saint-Aigulin (17309)
84. Saint-Bonnet-sur-Gironde (17312)
85. Saint-Ciers-Champagne (17316)
86. Saint-Ciers-du-Taillon (17317)
87. Saint-Dizant-du-Bois (17324)
88. Saint-Dizant-du-Gua (17325)
89. Sainte-Colombe (17319)
90. Sainte-Lheurine (17355)
91. Sainte-Ramée (17390)
92. Saint-Eugène (17326)
93. Saint-Fort-sur-Gironde (17328)
94. Saint-Genis-de-Saintonge (17331)
95. Saint-Georges-Antignac (17332)
96. Saint-Georges-des-Agoûts (17335)
97. Saint-Germain-de-Lusignan (17339)
98. Saint-Germain-de-Vibrac (17341)
99. Saint-Germain-du-Seudre (17342)
100. Saint-Grégoire-d'Ardennes (17343)
101. Saint-Hilaire-du-Bois (17345)
102. Saint-Léger (17354)
103. Saint-Maigrin (17357)
104. Saint-Martial-de-Mirambeau (17362)
105. Saint-Martial-de-Vitaterne (17363)
106. Saint-Martial-sur-Né (17364)
107. Saint-Martin-d'Ary (17365)
108. Saint-Martin-de-Coux (17366)
109. Saint-Médard (17372)
110. Saint-Palais-de-Négrignac (17378)
111. Saint-Palais-de-Phiolin (17379)
112. Saint-Pierre-du-Palais (17386)
113. Saint-Quantin-de-Rançanne (17388)
114. Saint-Seurin-de-Palenne (17398)
115. Saint-Sigismond-de-Clermont (17402)
116. Saint-Simon-de-Bordes (17403)
117. Saint-Sorlin-de-Conac (17405)
118. Saint-Thomas-de-Conac (17410)
119. Salignac-de-Mirambeau (17417)
120. Salignac-sur-Charente (17418)
121. Semillac (17423)
122. Semoussac (17424)
123. Soubran (17430)
124. Souméras (17432)
125. Sousmoulins (17433)
126. Tugéras-Saint-Maurice (17454)
127. Vanzac (17458)
128. Vibrac (17468)
129. Villexavier (17476)

== History ==
The arrondissement of Jonzac was created in 1800. At the January 2017 reorganisation of the arrondissements of Charente-Maritime, it gained 17 communes from the arrondissement of Saintes.

As a result of the reorganisation of the cantons of France which came into effect in 2015, the borders of the cantons are no longer related to the borders of the arrondissements. The cantons of the arrondissement of Jonzac were, as of January 2015:

1. Archiac
2. Jonzac
3. Mirambeau
4. Montendre
5. Montguyon
6. Montlieu-la-Garde
7. Saint-Genis-de-Saintonge
