= Pommiers-Moulons =

- Commune
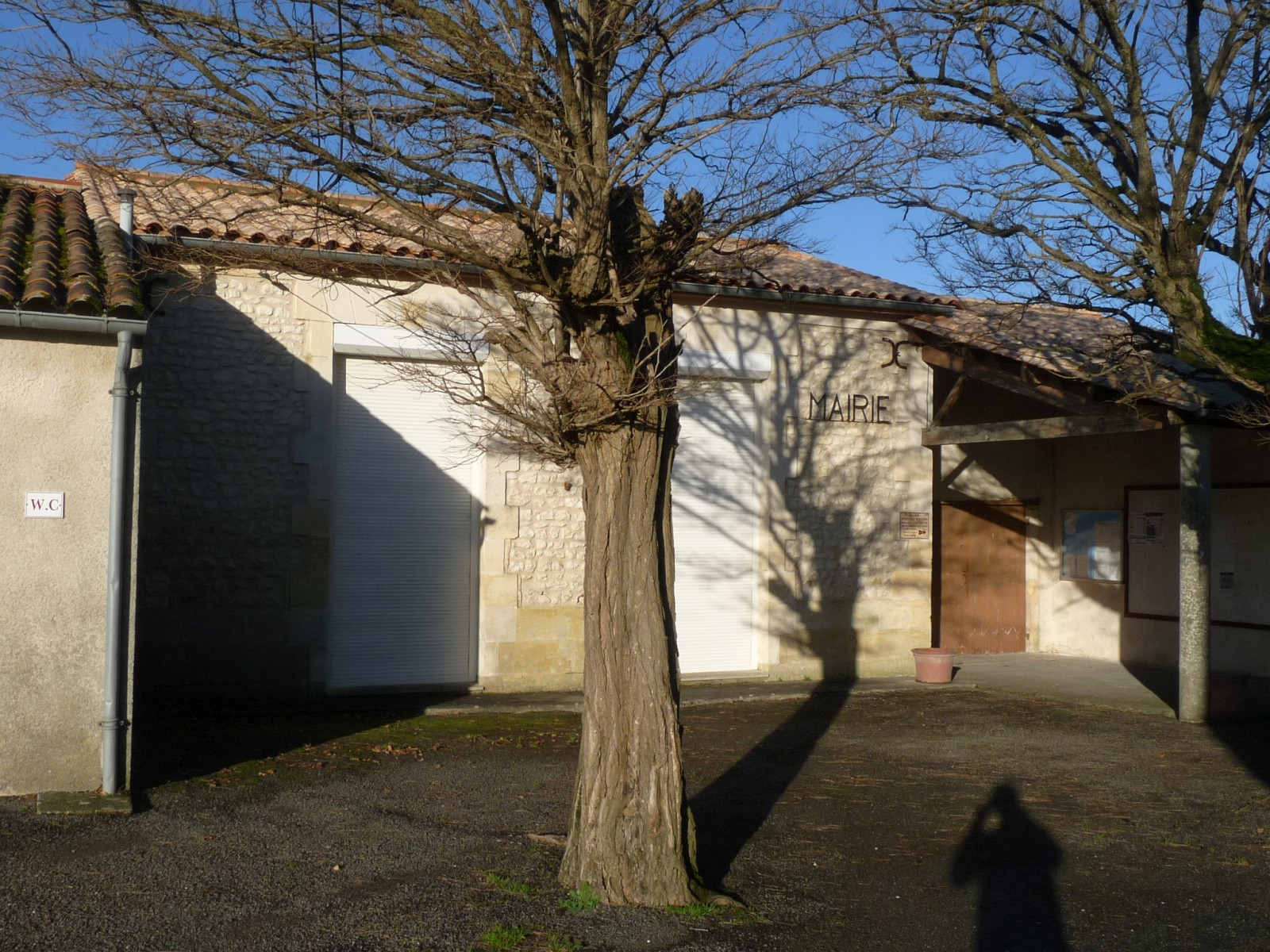
- The town hall in Pommiers-Moulons
- Location of Pommiers-Moulons
- Location within France Location within Nouvelle-Aquitaine
- Coordinates: 45°19′30″N 0°21′06″W
- Country: France
- Region: Nouvelle-Aquitaine
- Department: Charente-Maritime
- Arrondissement: Jonzac
- Canton: Les Trois Monts
- Intercommunality: Haute-Saintonge

Government
  - Mayor (2020–2026): Hervé Charlassier
- Area^{1}: 9.6 km^{2} (3.7 sq mi)
- Elevation: 90 m (300 ft)
- Highest elevation: 114 m (374 ft)
- Lowest elevation: 49 m (161 ft)
- Population (2023): 212
  - Density: 22/km^{2} (57/sq mi)
- Time zone: UTC+01:00 (CET)
  - Summer (DST): UTC+02:00 (CEST)
- INSEE/Postal code: 17282 /17130
- ^{1} French Land Register data, which excludes lakes, ponds, glaciers > 1 km^{2} (0.386 sq mi or 247 acres) and river estuaries.

Pommiers-Moulons (French pronunciation: [pɔmje mulɔ̃]) is a commune in the Charente-Maritime department in southwestern France. It was created in 1974 by the merger of two former communes: Pommiers and Moulons.

== Geography ==
The Seugne forms most of the commune's northeastern border.

== Population ==
Historical population
Year	Pop.	±% p.a.
1968	244	—
1975	226	−1.09%
1982	203	−1.52%
1990	182	−1.36%
1999	174	−0.50%
2007	188	+0.97%
2012	196	+0.84%
2017	207	+1.10%
2023	212	+0.40%
Source: INSEE

== See also ==
- Communes of the Charente-Maritime department
