= Lussac, Charente-Maritime =

Lussac
- Commune
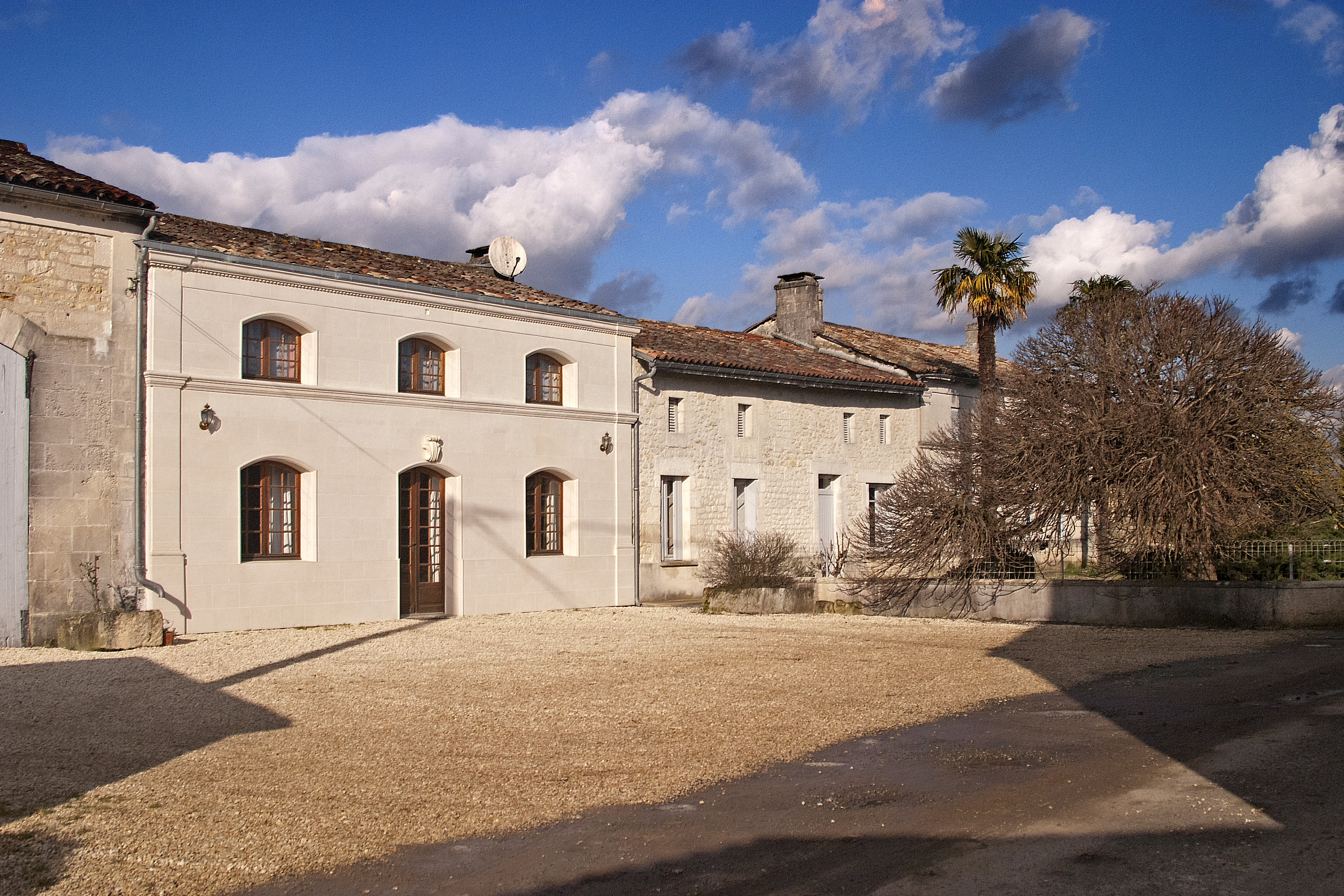
- A view within the village of Lussac
- Location of Lussac
- Location within France Location within Nouvelle-Aquitaine
- Coordinates: 45°28′15″N 0°28′34″W
- Country: France
- Region: Nouvelle-Aquitaine
- Department: Charente-Maritime
- Arrondissement: Jonzac
- Canton: Jonzac

Government
  - Mayor (2020–2026): Manuela Fortier
- Area^{1}: 1.72 km^{2} (0.66 sq mi)
- Highest elevation: 45 m (148 ft)
- Lowest elevation: 22 m (72 ft)
- Population (2023): 39
  - Density: 23/km^{2} (59/sq mi)
- Time zone: UTC+01:00 (CET)
  - Summer (DST): UTC+02:00 (CEST)
- INSEE/Postal code: 17215 /17500
- ^{1} French Land Register data, which excludes lakes, ponds, glaciers > 1 km^{2} (0.386 sq mi or 247 acres) and river estuaries.

Lussac (French pronunciation: [lysak]) is a commune in the Charente-Maritime department in the Nouvelle-Aquitaine region in southwestern France. It is the least populated commune in the canton of Jonzac.

== Geography ==
The village lies above the right bank of the Seugne, which forms most of the commune's western border.

== Population ==
Historical population
Year	Pop.	±% p.a.
1968	39	—
1975	43	+1.40%
1982	31	−4.57%
1990	48	+5.62%
1999	43	−1.21%
2007	48	+1.38%
2012	56	+3.13%
2017	52	−1.47%
2023	39	−4.68%
Source: INSEE

== See also ==
- Communes of the Charente-Maritime department
