= Colombiers, Charente-Maritime =

Colombiers
- Commune
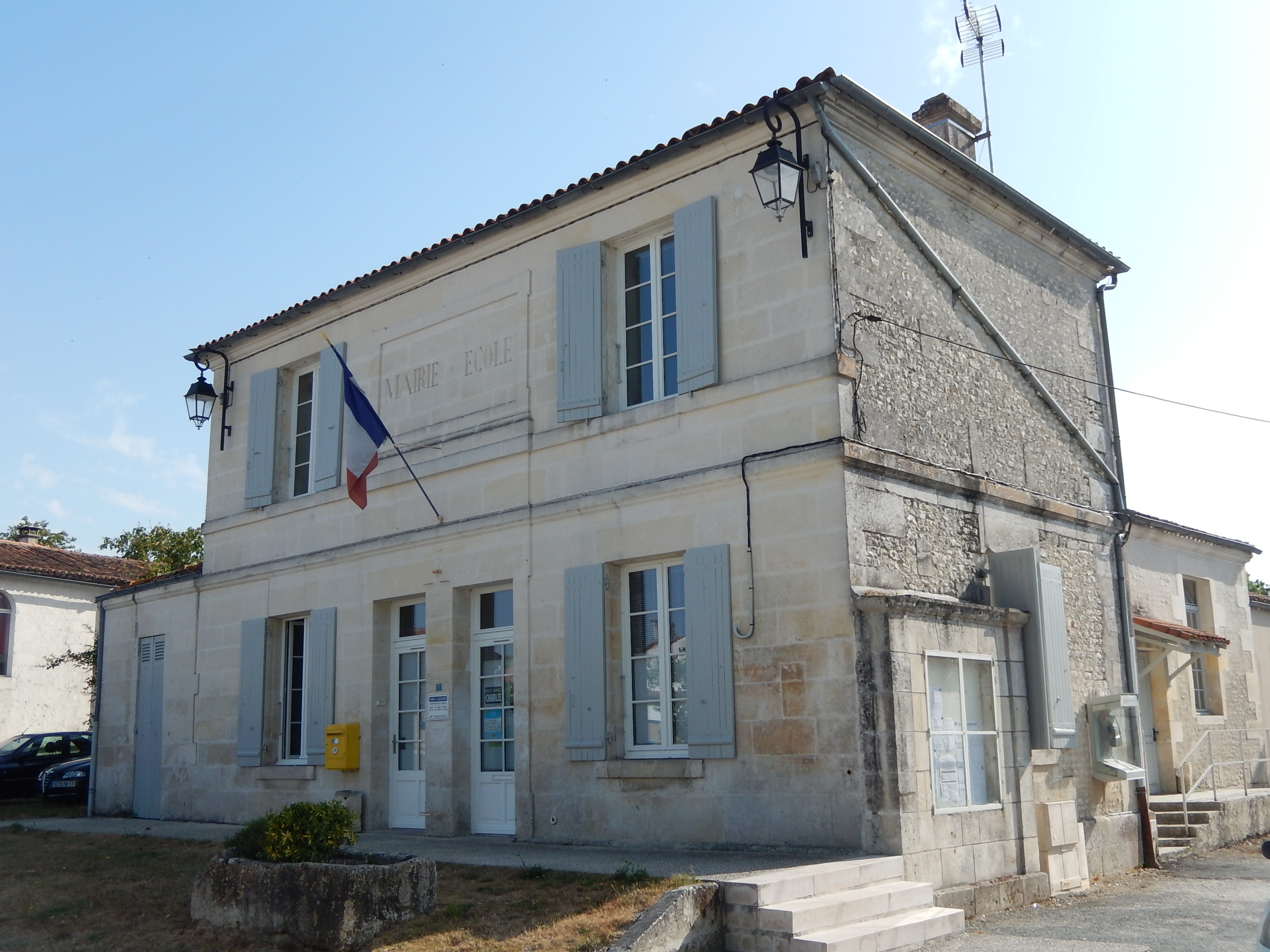
- The town hall in Colombiers
- Location of Colombiers
- Location within France Location within Nouvelle-Aquitaine
- Coordinates: 45°38′40″N 0°32′57″W
- Country: France
- Region: Nouvelle-Aquitaine
- Department: Charente-Maritime
- Arrondissement: Saintes
- Canton: Thénac
- Intercommunality: CA Saintes

Government
  - Mayor (2022–2026): Aurore Deschamps
- Area^{1}: 7.14 km^{2} (2.76 sq mi)
- Highest elevation: 57 m (187 ft)
- Lowest elevation: 6 m (20 ft)
- Population (2023): 306
  - Density: 42.9/km^{2} (111/sq mi)
- Time zone: UTC+01:00 (CET)
  - Summer (DST): UTC+02:00 (CEST)
- INSEE/Postal code: 17115 /17460
- ^{1} French Land Register data, which excludes lakes, ponds, glaciers > 1 km^{2} (0.386 sq mi or 247 acres) and river estuaries.

Colombiers (French pronunciation: [kɔlɔ̃bje]) is a commune in the Charente-Maritime department in southwestern France.

== Geography ==
The river Seugne forms most of the commune's eastern border.

== Population ==
Historical population
| Year | Pop. | ±% p.a. |
|---|---|---|
| 1968 | 216 | — |
| 1975 | 222 | +0.39% |
| 1982 | 218 | −0.26% |
| 1990 | 217 | −0.06% |
| 1999 | 254 | +1.76% |
| 2007 | 321 | +2.97% |
| 2012 | 329 | +0.49% |
| 2017 | 313 | −0.99% |
| 2023 | 306 | −0.38% |
Source: INSEE

== See also ==
- Communes of the Charente-Maritime department
