= Léoville =

- Commune
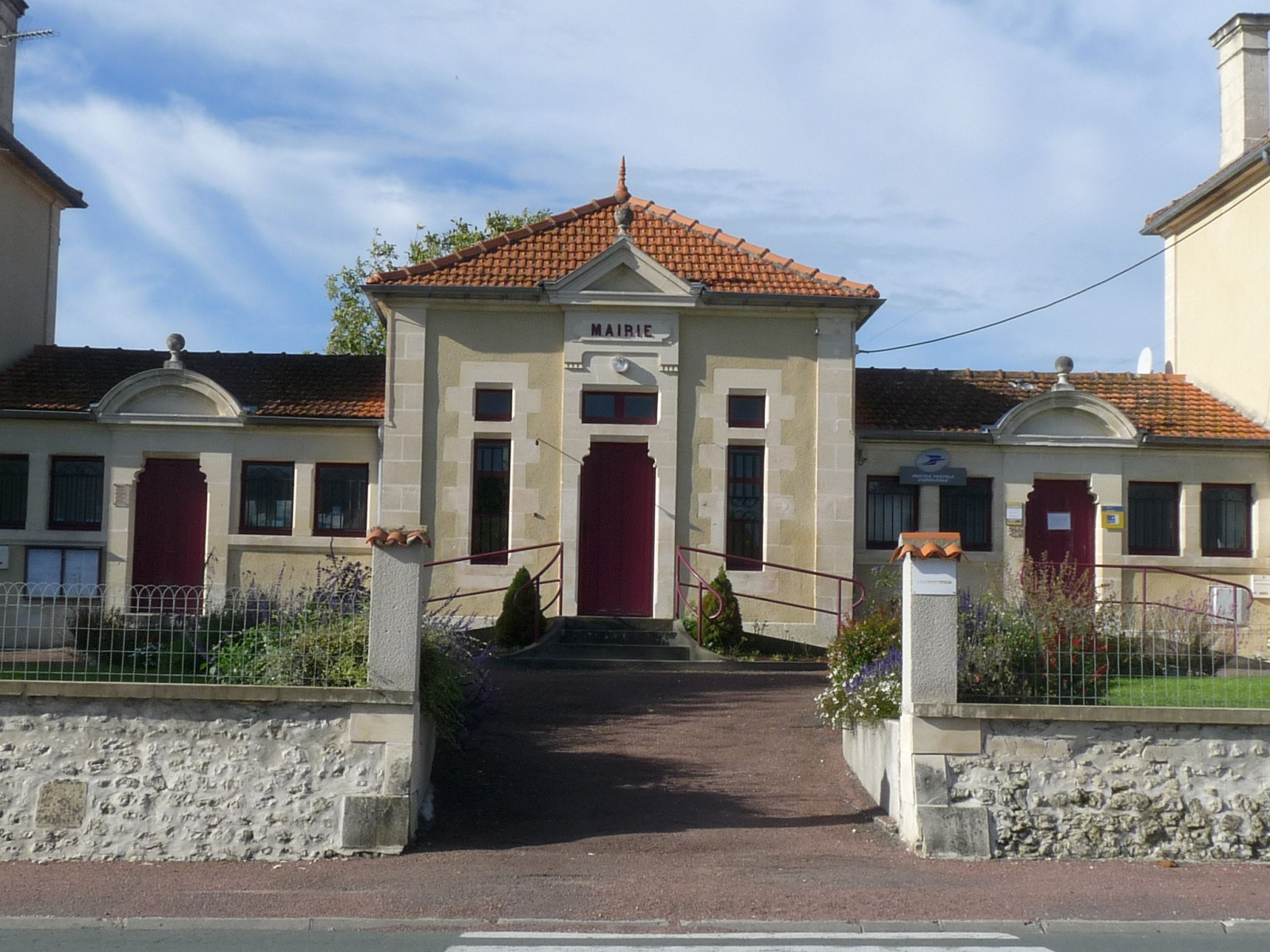
- The town hall in Léoville
- Location of Léoville
- Location within France Location within Nouvelle-Aquitaine
- Coordinates: 45°22′46″N 0°20′15″W
- Country: France
- Region: Nouvelle-Aquitaine
- Department: Charente-Maritime
- Arrondissement: Jonzac
- Canton: Jonzac

Government
  - Mayor (2020–2026): Bernard Landreau
- Area^{1}: 9.89 km^{2} (3.82 sq mi)
- Highest elevation: 97 m (318 ft)
- Lowest elevation: 39 m (128 ft)
- Population (2023): 300
  - Density: 30/km^{2} (79/sq mi)
- Time zone: UTC+01:00 (CET)
  - Summer (DST): UTC+02:00 (CEST)
- INSEE/Postal code: 17204 /17500
- ^{1} French Land Register data, which excludes lakes, ponds, glaciers > 1 km^{2} (0.386 sq mi or 247 acres) and river estuaries.

Léoville (French pronunciation: [leovil]) is a commune in the Charente-Maritime department in southwestern France.

== Geography ==
The village lies in the middle of the commune, on the left bank of the Lariat, a stream tributary of the Seugne, which forms all of the commune's western border.

== Population ==
Historical population
Year	Pop.	±% p.a.
1968	331	—
1975	272	−2.77%
1982	276	+0.21%
1990	264	−0.55%
1999	300	+1.43%
2007	308	+0.33%
2012	328	+1.27%
2017	312	−1.00%
2023	300	−0.65%
Source: INSEE

== See also ==
- Communes of the Charente-Maritime department
