= Saint-Georges-Antignac =

- Commune
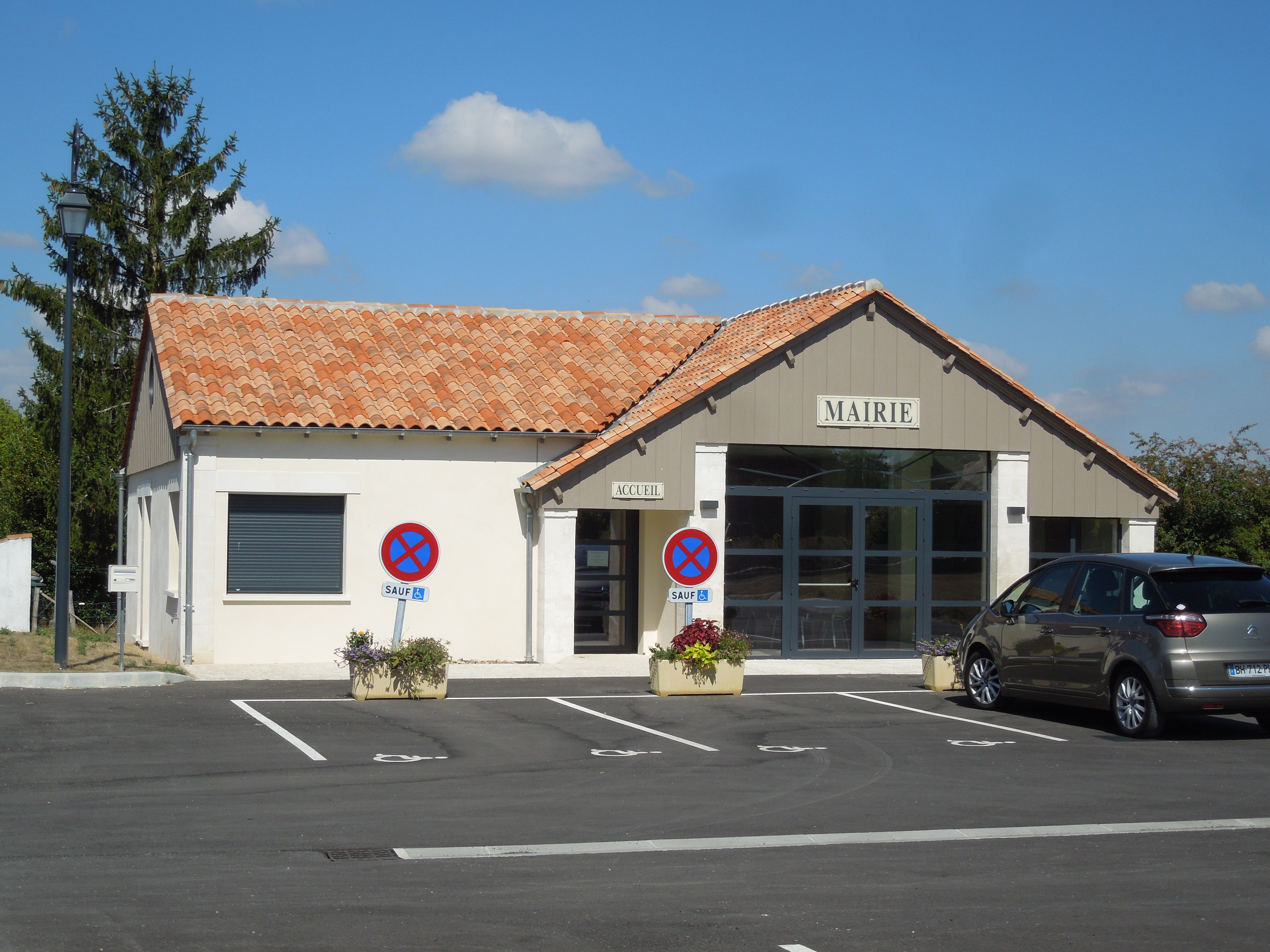
- The town hall in Saint-Georges-Antignac
- Location of Saint-Georges-Antignac
- Location within France Location within Nouvelle-Aquitaine
- Coordinates: 45°29′39″N 0°30′09″W
- Country: France
- Region: Nouvelle-Aquitaine
- Department: Charente-Maritime
- Arrondissement: Jonzac
- Canton: Jonzac
- Intercommunality: Haute-Saintonge

Government
  - Mayor (2020–2026): Christian Huillin
- Area^{1}: 10.10 km^{2} (3.90 sq mi)
- Elevation: 35 m (115 ft)
- Highest elevation: 69 m (226 ft)
- Lowest elevation: 17 m (56 ft)
- Population (2023): 416
  - Density: 41.2/km^{2} (107/sq mi)
- Time zone: UTC+01:00 (CET)
  - Summer (DST): UTC+02:00 (CEST)
- INSEE/Postal code: 17332 /17240
- ^{1} French Land Register data, which excludes lakes, ponds, glaciers > 1 km^{2} (0.386 sq mi or 247 acres) and river estuaries.

Saint-Georges-Antignac (French pronunciation: [sɛ̃ ʒɔʁʒ ɑ̃tiɲak]) is a commune in the Charente-Maritime department in southwestern France. It was created in 1974 by the merger of two former communes: Saint-Georges-de-Cubillac and Antignac.

== Geography ==
The village lies on the right bank of the Seugne, which forms most of the commune's western border.

== Population ==
Historical population
Year	Pop.	±% p.a.
1968	430	—
1975	391	−1.35%
1982	337	−2.10%
1990	344	+0.26%
1999	375	+0.96%
2007	410	+1.12%
2012	384	−1.30%
2017	379	−0.26%
2023	416	+1.56%
Source: INSEE

== See also ==
- Communes of the Charente-Maritime department
