= Belluire =

- Commune
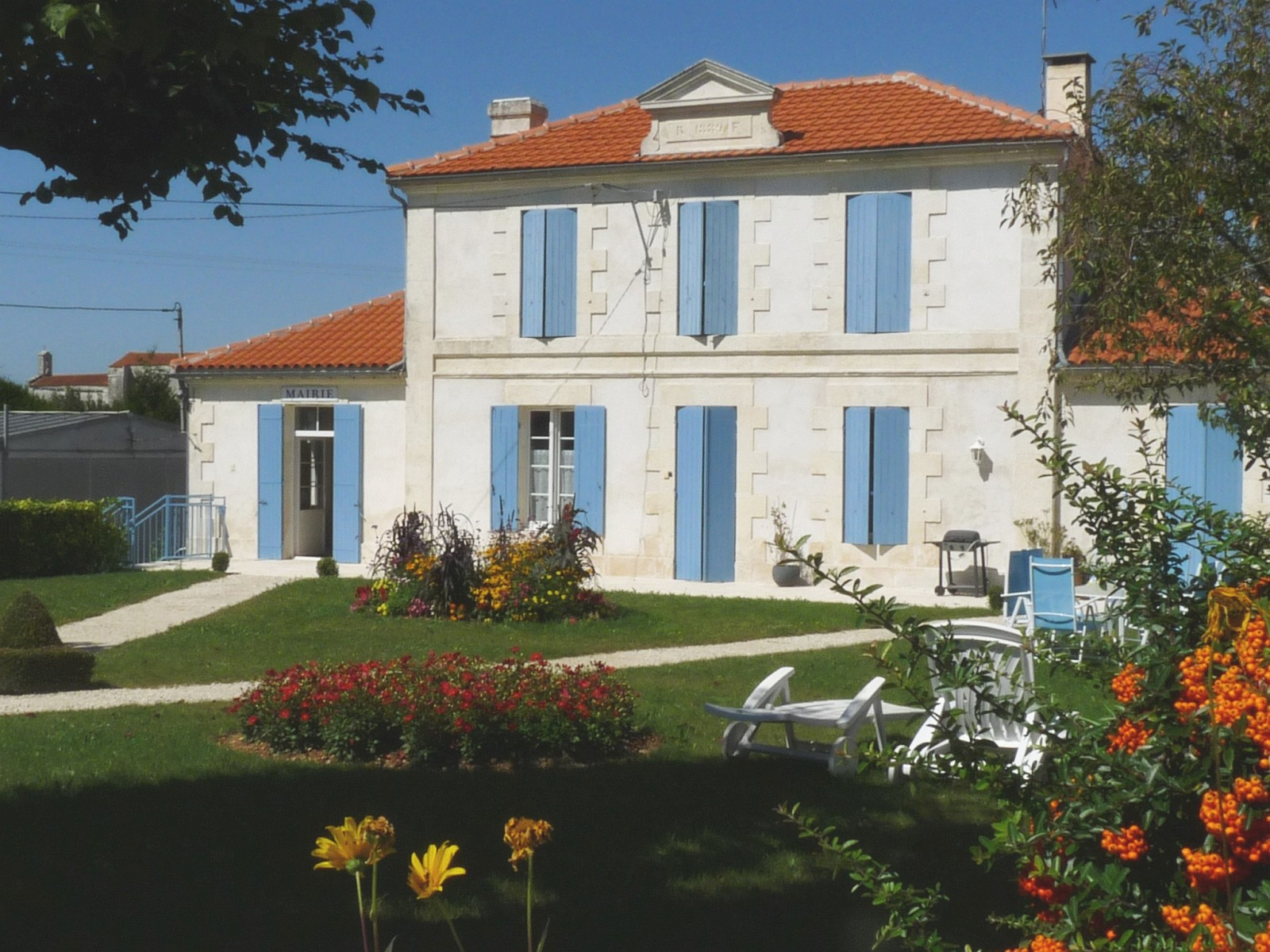
- The town hall in Belluire
- Location of Belluire
- Location within France Location within Nouvelle-Aquitaine
- Coordinates: 45°32′10″N 0°33′31″W
- Country: France
- Region: Nouvelle-Aquitaine
- Department: Charente-Maritime
- Arrondissement: Jonzac
- Canton: Pons

Government
  - Mayor (2020–2026): Jean-Jacques Dessaivre
- Area^{1}: 4.50 km^{2} (1.74 sq mi)
- Highest elevation: 42 m (138 ft)
- Lowest elevation: 14 m (46 ft)
- Population (2023): 214
  - Density: 47.6/km^{2} (123/sq mi)
- Time zone: UTC+01:00 (CET)
  - Summer (DST): UTC+02:00 (CEST)
- INSEE/Postal code: 17039 /17800
- ^{1} French Land Register data, which excludes lakes, ponds, glaciers > 1 km^{2} (0.386 sq mi or 247 acres) and river estuaries.

Belluire (French pronunciation: [bɛlɥiʁ]) is a commune in the Charente-Maritime department in southwestern France.

== Geography ==
The Seugne forms most of the commune's eastern border.

== Population ==
Historical population
Year	Pop.	±% p.a.
1968	198	—
1975	188	−0.74%
1982	186	−0.15%
1990	168	−1.26%
1999	195	+1.67%
2007	170	−1.70%
2012	216	+4.91%
2017	208	−0.75%
2023	214	+0.48%
Source: INSEE

== See also ==
- Communes of the Charente-Maritime department
