= Sousmoulins =

- Commune
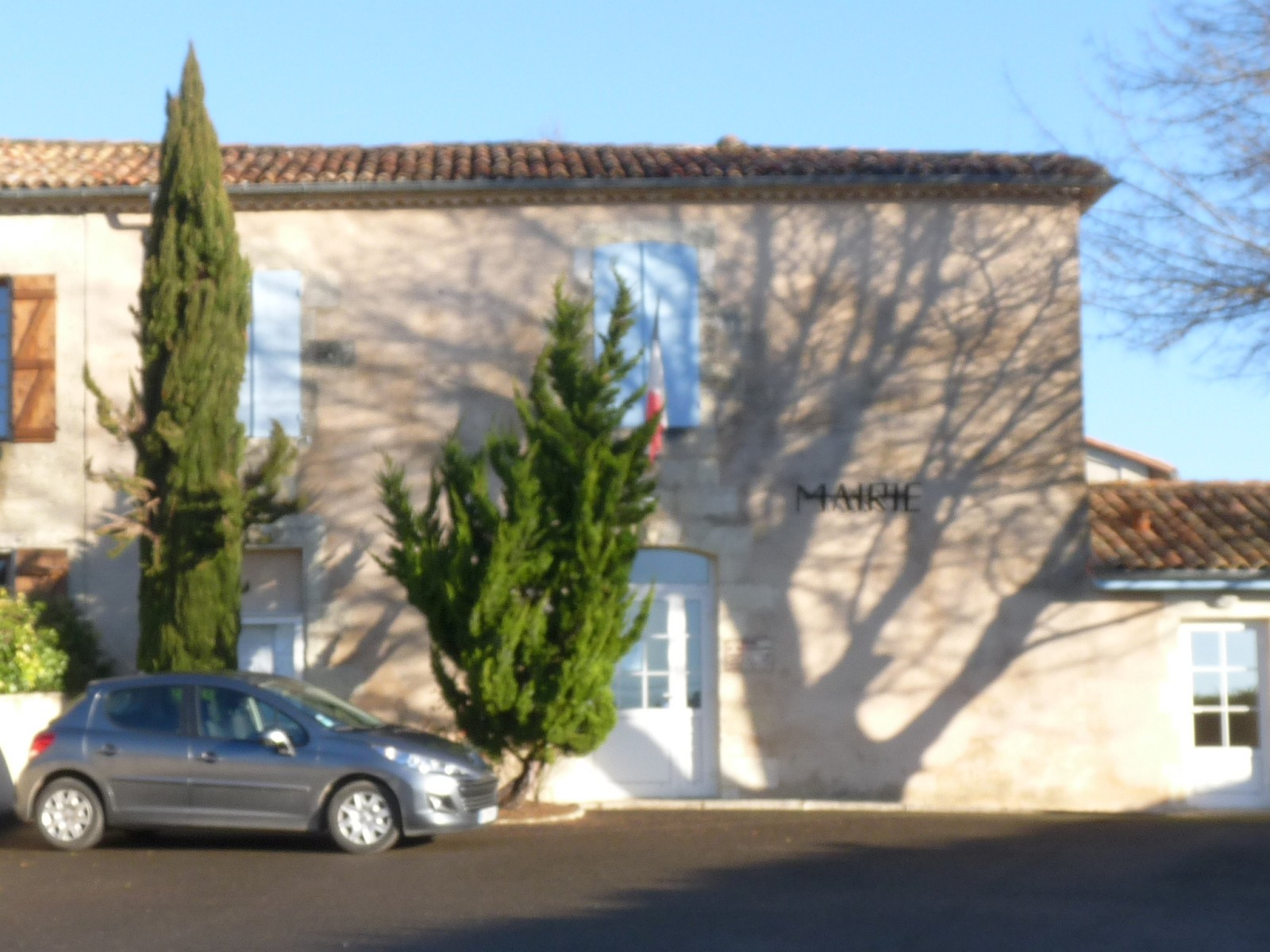
- The town hall in Sousmoulins
- Location of Sousmoulins
- Location within France Location within Nouvelle-Aquitaine
- Coordinates: 45°18′34″N 0°19′44″W
- Country: France
- Region: Nouvelle-Aquitaine
- Department: Charente-Maritime
- Arrondissement: Jonzac
- Canton: Les Trois Monts
- Intercommunality: Haute-Saintonge

Government
  - Mayor (2020–2026): Lionel Bonin
- Area^{1}: 7.70 km^{2} (2.97 sq mi)
- Elevation: 118 m (387 ft)
- Highest elevation: 125 m (410 ft)
- Lowest elevation: 54 m (177 ft)
- Population (2023): 229
  - Density: 29.7/km^{2} (77.0/sq mi)
- Time zone: UTC+01:00 (CET)
  - Summer (DST): UTC+02:00 (CEST)
- INSEE/Postal code: 17433 /17130
- ^{1} French Land Register data, which excludes lakes, ponds, glaciers > 1 km^{2} (0.386 sq mi or 247 acres) and river estuaries.

Sousmoulins (French pronunciation: [sumulɛ̃]) is a commune in the Charente-Maritime department in southwestern France.

== Geography ==
The Seugne forms part of the commune's northeastern border.

== Population ==
Historical population
Year	Pop.	±% p.a.
1968	237	—
1975	227	−0.61%
1982	208	−1.24%
1990	196	−0.74%
1999	189	−0.40%
2007	210	+1.33%
2012	214	+0.38%
2017	219	+0.46%
2023	229	+0.75%
Source: INSEE

== See also ==
- Communes of the Charente-Maritime department
