= Courcoury =

- Commune
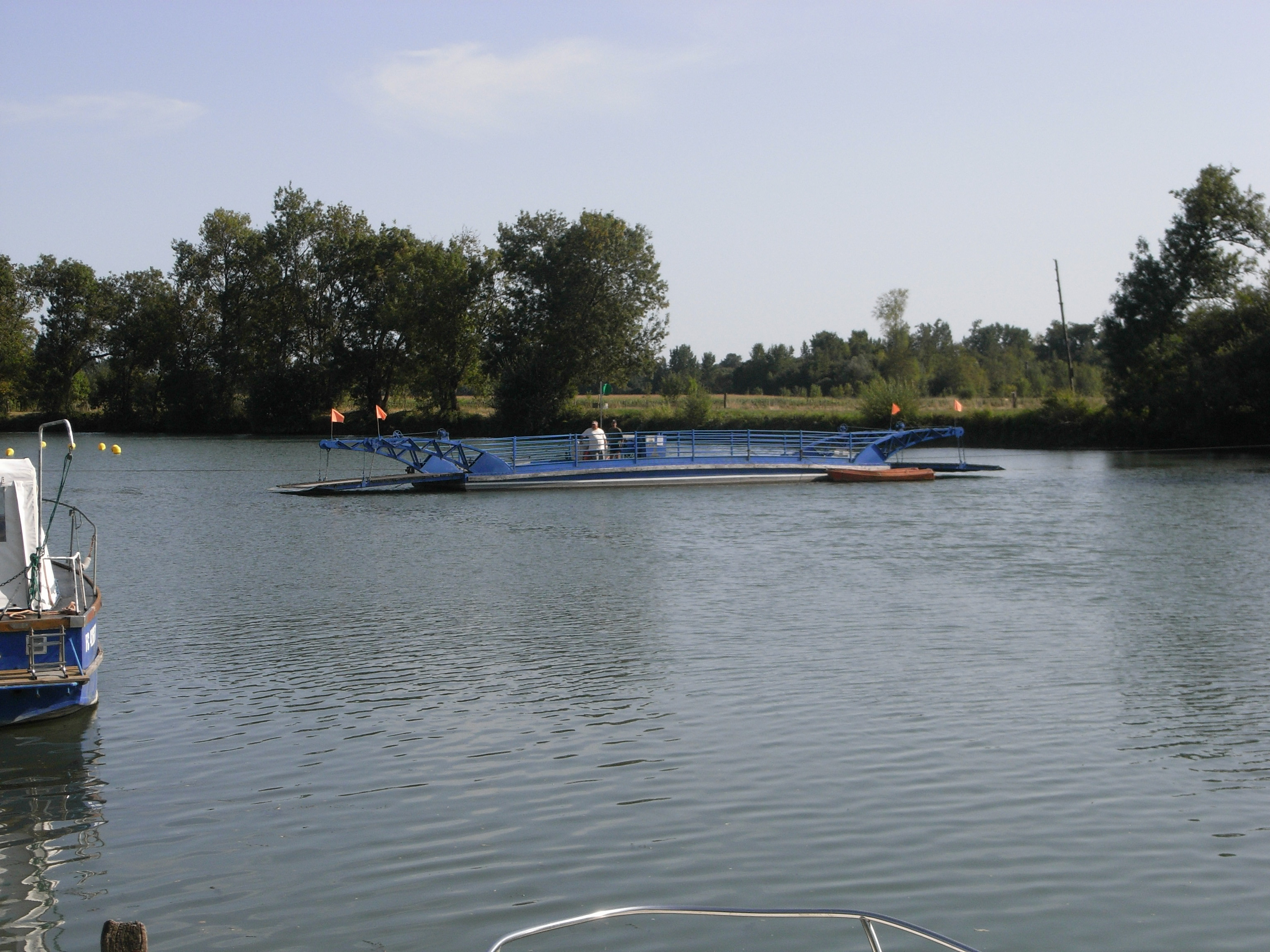
- Ferry
- Location of Courcoury
- Location within France Location within Nouvelle-Aquitaine
- Coordinates: 45°42′46″N 0°34′44″W
- Country: France
- Region: Nouvelle-Aquitaine
- Department: Charente-Maritime
- Arrondissement: Saintes
- Canton: Thénac
- Intercommunality: CA Saintes

Government
  - Mayor (2020–2026): Éric Bigot
- Area^{1}: 12.66 km^{2} (4.89 sq mi)
- Elevation: 15 m (49 ft)
- Highest elevation: 30 m (98 ft)
- Lowest elevation: 2 m (6.6 ft)
- Population (2023): 721
  - Density: 57.0/km^{2} (148/sq mi)
- Time zone: UTC+01:00 (CET)
  - Summer (DST): UTC+02:00 (CEST)
- INSEE/Postal code: 17128 /17100
- ^{1} French Land Register data, which excludes lakes, ponds, glaciers > 1 km^{2} (0.386 sq mi or 247 acres) and river estuaries.

Courcoury (French pronunciation: [kuʁkuʁi]) is a commune in the Charente-Maritime department in southwestern France.

== Geography ==
The Seugne river flows into the Charente in the commune, 2.5 km east of the village.

== Population ==
Historical population
Year	Pop.	±% p.a.
1968	528	—
1975	471	−1.62%
1982	525	+1.56%
1990	546	+0.49%
1999	571	+0.50%
2007	699	+2.56%
2012	713	+0.40%
2017	690	−0.65%
2023	721	+0.74%
Source: INSEE

== See also ==
- Communes of the Charente-Maritime department
