= Saint-Germain-de-Lusignan =

- Commune
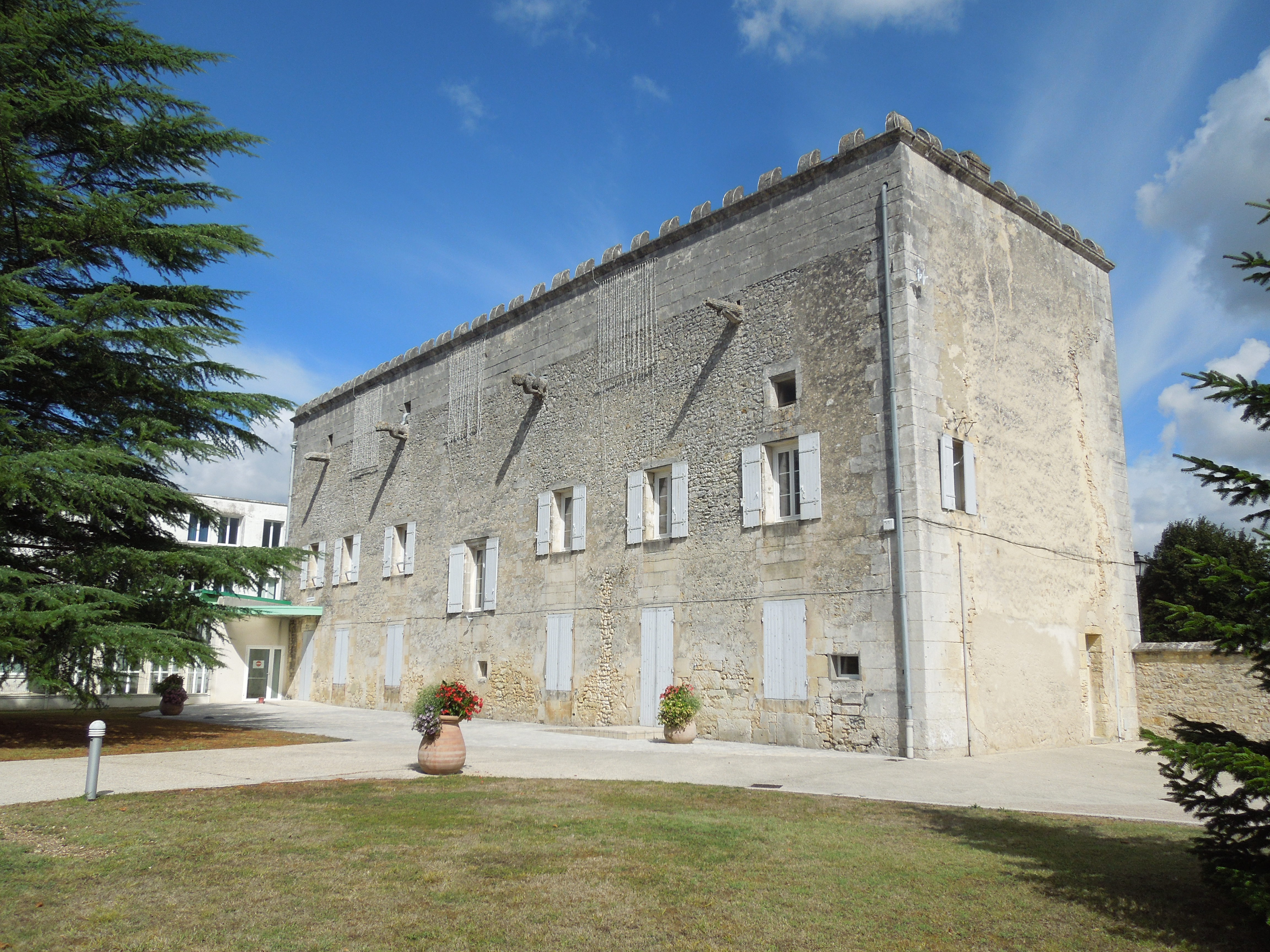
- The town hall in Saint-Germain-de-Lusignan
- Location of Saint-Germain-de-Lusignan
- Location within France Location within Nouvelle-Aquitaine
- Coordinates: 45°27′02″N 0°27′33″W
- Country: France
- Region: Nouvelle-Aquitaine
- Department: Charente-Maritime
- Arrondissement: Jonzac
- Canton: Jonzac

Government
  - Mayor (2020–2026): Claude Martial
- Area^{1}: 18.05 km^{2} (6.97 sq mi)
- Highest elevation: 87 m (285 ft)
- Lowest elevation: 26 m (85 ft)
- Population (2023): 1,299
  - Density: 71.97/km^{2} (186.4/sq mi)
- Time zone: UTC+01:00 (CET)
  - Summer (DST): UTC+02:00 (CEST)
- INSEE/Postal code: 17339 /17500
- ^{1} French Land Register data, which excludes lakes, ponds, glaciers > 1 km^{2} (0.386 sq mi or 247 acres) and river estuaries.

Saint-Germain-de-Lusignan (French pronunciation: [sɛ̃ ʒɛʁmɛ̃ də lyziɲɑ̃]) is a commune in the Charente-Maritime department in the Nouvelle-Aquitaine region in southwestern France.

== Geography ==
The river Seugne flows northwest through the commune.

== Population ==
Historical population
Year	Pop.	±% p.a.
1968	725	—
1975	909	+3.28%
1982	1,090	+2.63%
1990	1,166	+0.85%
1999	1,145	−0.20%
2007	1,213	+0.72%
2012	1,238	+0.41%
2017	1,303	+1.03%
2023	1,299	−0.05%
Source: INSEE

== See also ==
- Communes of the Charente-Maritime department
