= Saint-Médard, Charente-Maritime =

Saint-Médard
- Commune
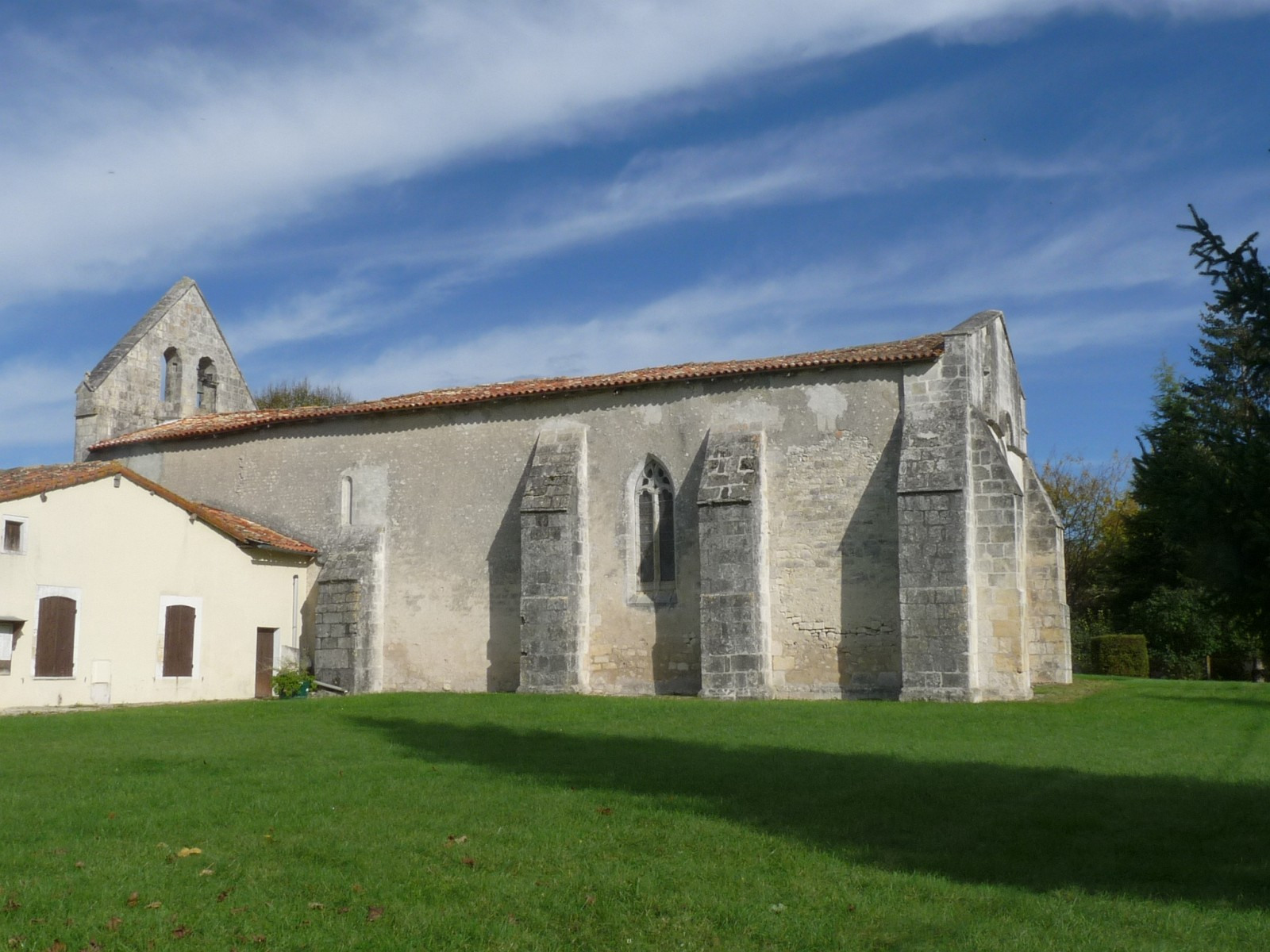
- Church
- Location of Saint-Médard
- Location within France Location within Nouvelle-Aquitaine
- Coordinates: 45°23′30″N 0°21′14″W
- Country: France
- Region: Nouvelle-Aquitaine
- Department: Charente-Maritime
- Arrondissement: Jonzac
- Canton: Jonzac

Government
  - Mayor (2020–2026): Loïc Édouard
- Area^{1}: 3.81 km^{2} (1.47 sq mi)
- Highest elevation: 91 m (299 ft)
- Lowest elevation: 38 m (125 ft)
- Population (2023): 91
  - Density: 24/km^{2} (62/sq mi)
- Time zone: UTC+01:00 (CET)
  - Summer (DST): UTC+02:00 (CEST)
- INSEE/Postal code: 17372 /17500
- ^{1} French Land Register data, which excludes lakes, ponds, glaciers > 1 km^{2} (0.386 sq mi or 247 acres) and river estuaries.

Saint-Médard (French pronunciation: [sɛ̃ medaʁ]) is a commune in the Charente-Maritime department in the Nouvelle-Aquitaine region in southwestern France.

== Geography ==
The village lies on the right bank of the Seugne, which flows northwest through the western part of the commune.

== Population ==
Historical population
Year	Pop.	±% p.a.
1968	58	—
1975	70	+2.72%
1982	55	−3.39%
1990	48	−1.69%
1999	69	+4.11%
2007	85	+2.64%
2012	70	−3.81%
2017	75	+1.39%
2023	91	+3.28%
Source: INSEE

== See also ==
- Communes of the Charente-Maritime department
