= Chatenet =

- Commune
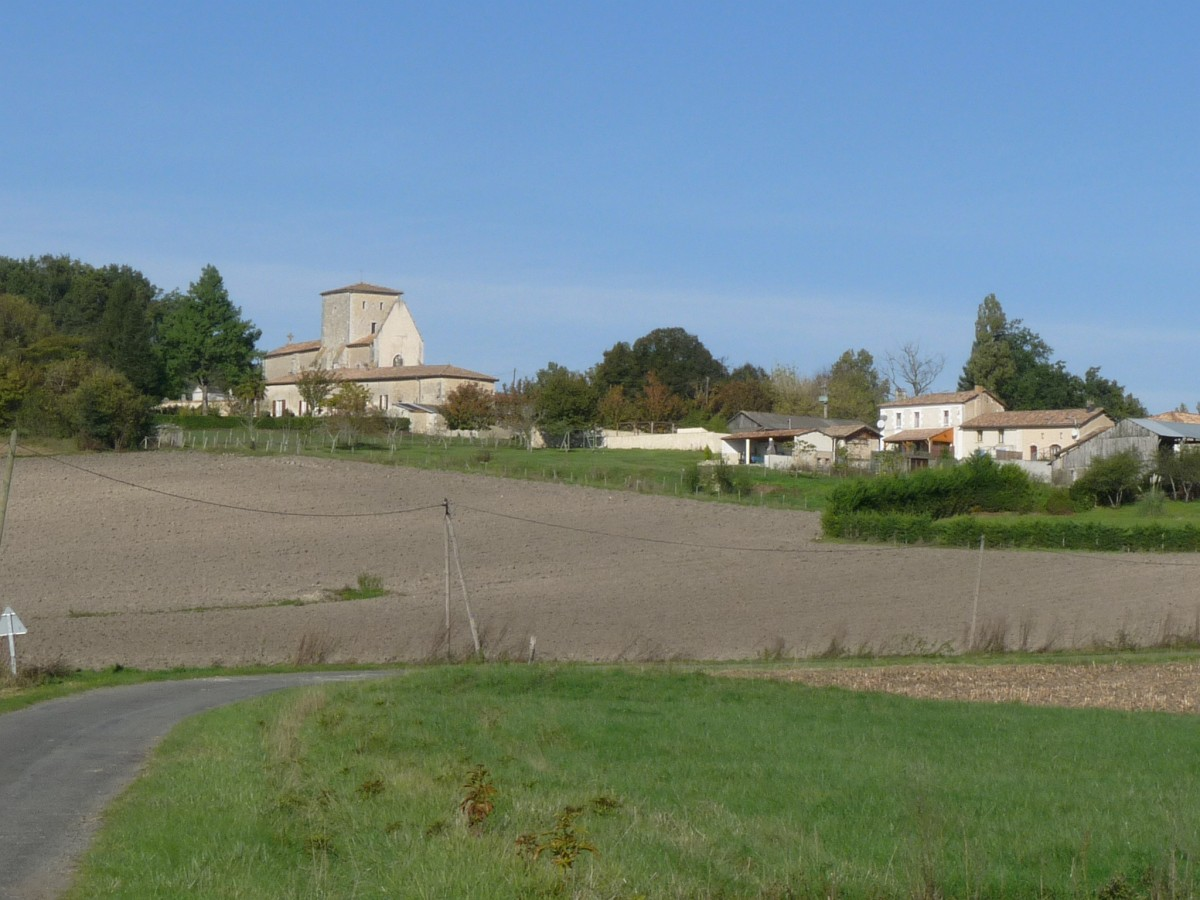
- A general view of Chatenet
- Location of Chatenet
- Location within France Location within Nouvelle-Aquitaine
- Coordinates: 45°18′09″N 0°18′19″W
- Country: France
- Region: Nouvelle-Aquitaine
- Department: Charente-Maritime
- Arrondissement: Jonzac
- Canton: Les Trois Monts
- Intercommunality: Haute-Saintonge

Government
  - Mayor (2020–2026): Philippe Chaillou
- Area^{1}: 9.6 km^{2} (3.7 sq mi)
- Elevation: 85 m (279 ft)
- Highest elevation: 123 m (404 ft)
- Lowest elevation: 61 m (200 ft)
- Population (2023): 221
  - Density: 23/km^{2} (60/sq mi)
- Time zone: UTC+01:00 (CET)
  - Summer (DST): UTC+02:00 (CEST)
- INSEE/Postal code: 17095 /17210
- ^{1} French Land Register data, which excludes lakes, ponds, glaciers > 1 km^{2} (0.386 sq mi or 247 acres) and river estuaries.

Chatenet (French pronunciation: [ʃatnɛ]) is a commune in the Charente-Maritime in the department in the Nouvelle-Aquitaine region in southwestern France.

== Geography ==
Chatenet is a small commune situated between the market town of Montendre and the large village of Chevanceaux. It is principally a farming community; however in recent years tourism has become important. The location of Chatenet in the southern tip of the Charente Maritime provides the area with a warm climate. The Seugne flows north-northwestward through the middle of the commune and forms part of its southern and northern borders.

== Population ==
Historical population
Year	Pop.	±% p.a.
1968	275	—
1975	215	−3.46%
1982	210	−0.34%
1990	195	−0.92%
1999	188	−0.41%
2007	217	+1.81%
2012	236	+1.69%
2017	222	−1.22%
2023	221	−0.08%
Source: INSEE

== See also ==
- Communes of the Charente-Maritime department
