= Mérignac, Charente-Maritime =

Mérignac
- Commune
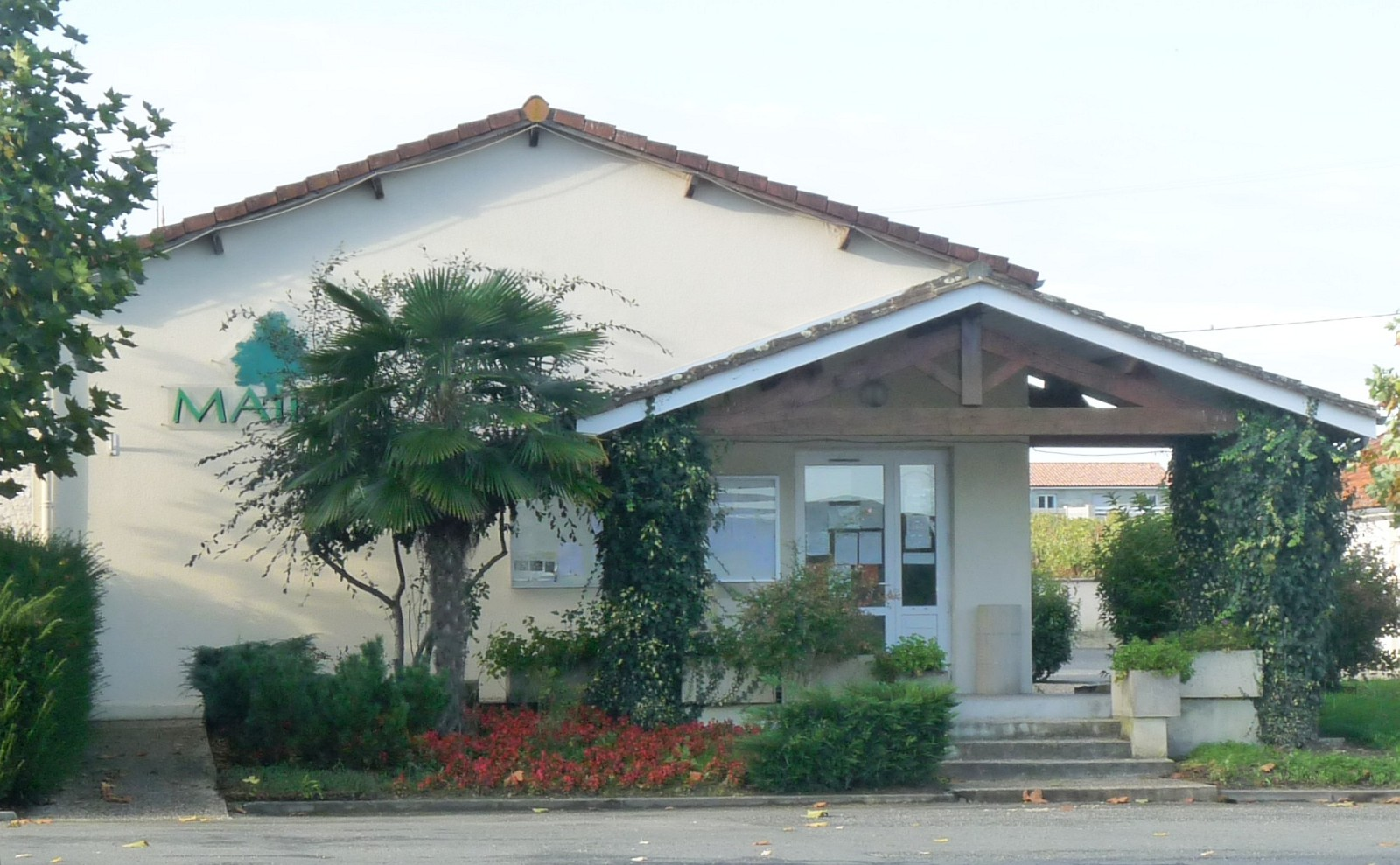
- The town hall in Mérignac
- Location of Mérignac
- Location within France Location within Nouvelle-Aquitaine
- Coordinates: 45°19′27″N 0°17′39″W
- Country: France
- Region: Nouvelle-Aquitaine
- Department: Charente-Maritime
- Arrondissement: Jonzac
- Canton: Les Trois Monts

Government
  - Mayor (2020–2026): Philippe Menneguerre
- Area^{1}: 4.41 km^{2} (1.70 sq mi)
- Elevation: 80 m (260 ft)
- Highest elevation: 101 m (331 ft)
- Lowest elevation: 55 m (180 ft)
- Population (2023): 237
  - Density: 53.7/km^{2} (139/sq mi)
- Time zone: UTC+01:00 (CET)
  - Summer (DST): UTC+02:00 (CEST)
- INSEE/Postal code: 17229 /17210
- ^{1} French Land Register data, which excludes lakes, ponds, glaciers > 1 km^{2} (0.386 sq mi or 247 acres) and river estuaries.

Mérignac (French pronunciation: [meʁiɲak]) is a commune in the Charente-Maritime department in southwestern France.

== Geography ==
The commune is traversed by the river Seugne, a tributary of the Charente.

== Population ==
Historical population
| Year | Pop. | ±% p.a. |
|---|---|---|
| 1968 | 240 | — |
| 1975 | 222 | −1.11% |
| 1982 | 176 | −3.26% |
| 1990 | 179 | +0.21% |
| 1999 | 206 | +1.57% |
| 2007 | 200 | −0.37% |
| 2012 | 239 | +3.63% |
| 2017 | 224 | −1.29% |
| 2023 | 237 | +0.94% |
Source: INSEE

== See also ==
- Communes of the Charente-Maritime department
