= Chepniers =

- Commune
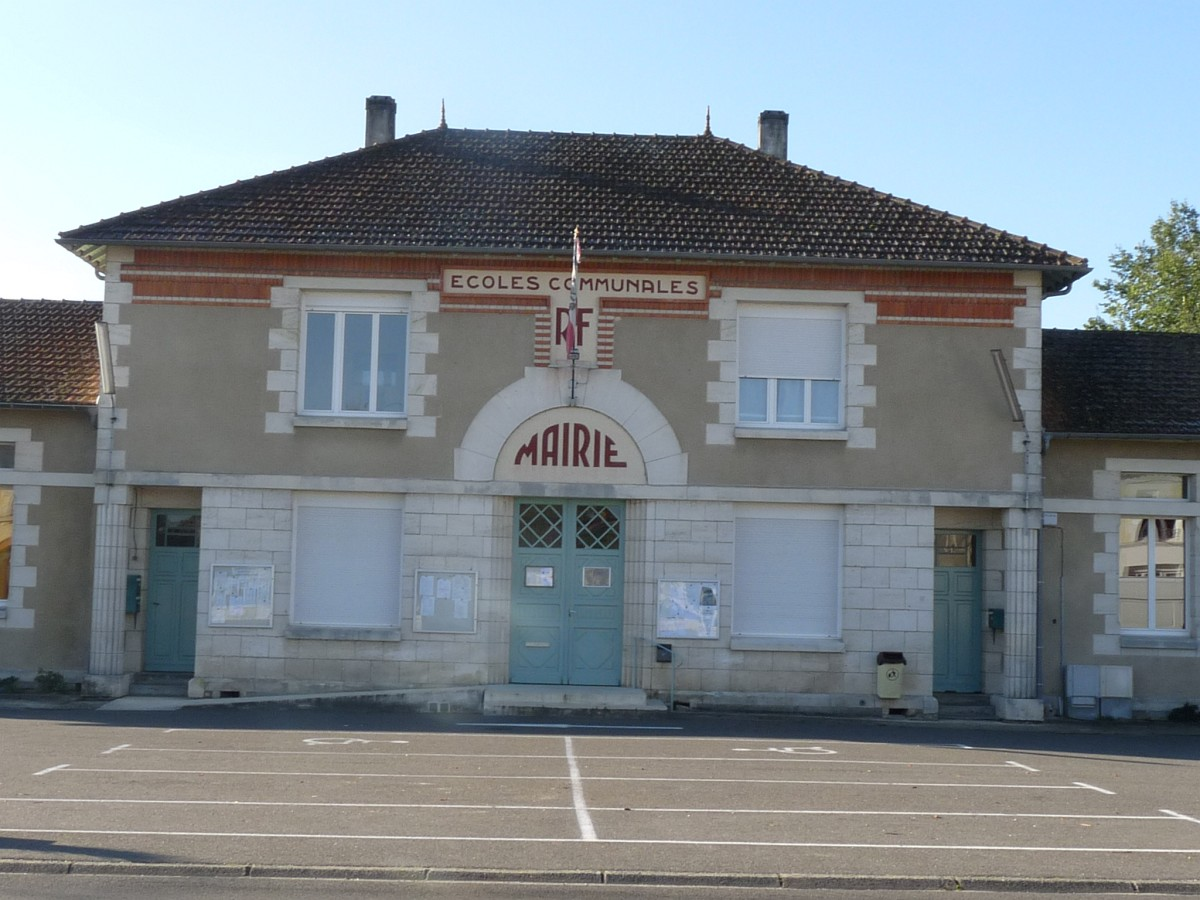
- The town hall in Chepniers
- Location of Chepniers
- Location within France Location within Nouvelle-Aquitaine
- Coordinates: 45°15′29″N 0°18′32″W
- Country: France
- Region: Nouvelle-Aquitaine
- Department: Charente-Maritime
- Arrondissement: Jonzac
- Canton: Les Trois Monts

Government
  - Mayor (2020–2026): Thierry Clemenceau
- Area^{1}: 28.21 km^{2} (10.89 sq mi)
- Elevation: 92 m (302 ft)
- Highest elevation: 126 m (413 ft)
- Lowest elevation: 66 m (217 ft)
- Population (2023): 697
  - Density: 24.7/km^{2} (64.0/sq mi)
- Time zone: UTC+01:00 (CET)
  - Summer (DST): UTC+02:00 (CEST)
- INSEE/Postal code: 17099 /17220
- ^{1} French Land Register data, which excludes lakes, ponds, glaciers > 1 km^{2} (0.386 sq mi or 247 acres) and river estuaries.

Chepniers is a commune in the Charente-Maritime in the department in the Nouvelle-Aquitaine region in southwestern France.

== Geography ==
The Seugne forms most of the commune's eastern border.

== Population ==
Historical population
Year	Pop.	±% p.a.
1968	734	—
1975	655	−1.61%
1982	617	−0.85%
1990	604	−0.27%
1999	643	+0.70%
2007	643	+0.00%
2012	675	+0.98%
2017	646	−0.87%
2023	697	+1.27%
Source: INSEE

== See also ==
- Communes of the Charente-Maritime department
