= Pouillac =

- Commune
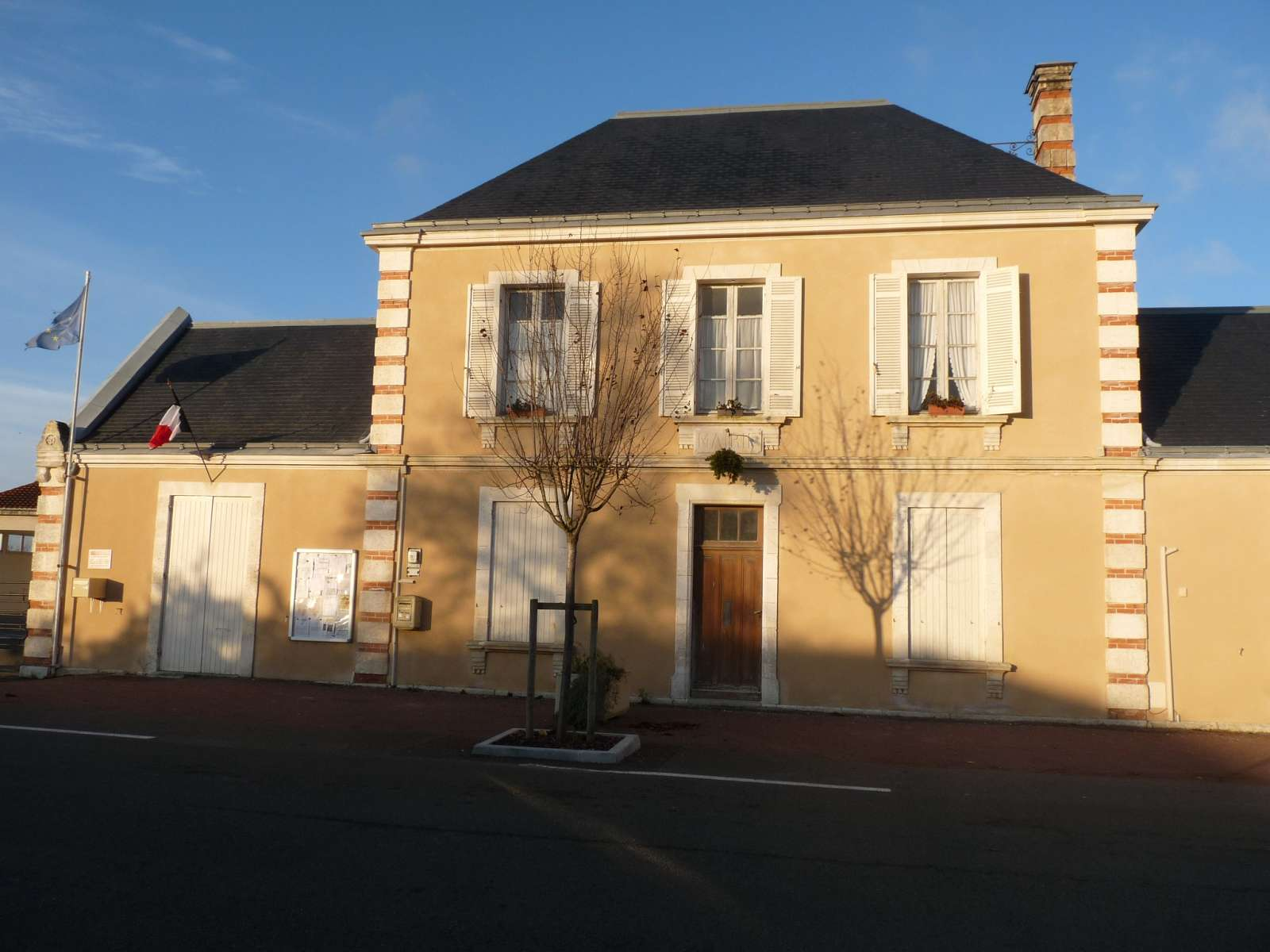
- Town hall
- Location of Pouillac
- Location within France Location within Nouvelle-Aquitaine
- Coordinates: 45°16′N 0°15′W
- Country: France
- Region: Nouvelle-Aquitaine
- Department: Charente-Maritime
- Arrondissement: Jonzac
- Canton: Les Trois Monts
- Intercommunality: Haute-Saintonge

Government
  - Mayor (2024–2026): Jean-Christophe Bertrand
- Area^{1}: 4.59 km^{2} (1.77 sq mi)
- Elevation: 137 m (449 ft)
- Highest elevation: 144 m (472 ft)
- Lowest elevation: 80 m (260 ft)
- Population (2023): 294
  - Density: 64.1/km^{2} (166/sq mi)
- Time zone: UTC+01:00 (CET)
  - Summer (DST): UTC+02:00 (CEST)
- INSEE/Postal code: 17287 /17220
- ^{1} French Land Register data, which excludes lakes, ponds, glaciers > 1 km^{2} (0.386 sq mi or 247 acres) and river estuaries.

Pouillac (French pronunciation: [pujak]) is a commune in the Charente-Maritime in the department in the Nouvelle-Aquitaine region in southwestern France.

== Geography ==
The Seugne forms most of the commune's southwestern border.

== Population ==
Historical population
Year	Pop.	±% p.a.
1968	283	—
1975	249	−1.81%
1982	234	−0.88%
1990	243	+0.47%
1999	230	−0.61%
2007	221	−0.50%
2012	264	+3.62%
2017	249	−1.16%
2023	294	+2.81%
Source: INSEE

== See also ==
- Communes of the Charente-Maritime department
