= Sainte-Colombe, Charente-Maritime =

Sainte-Colombe
- Commune
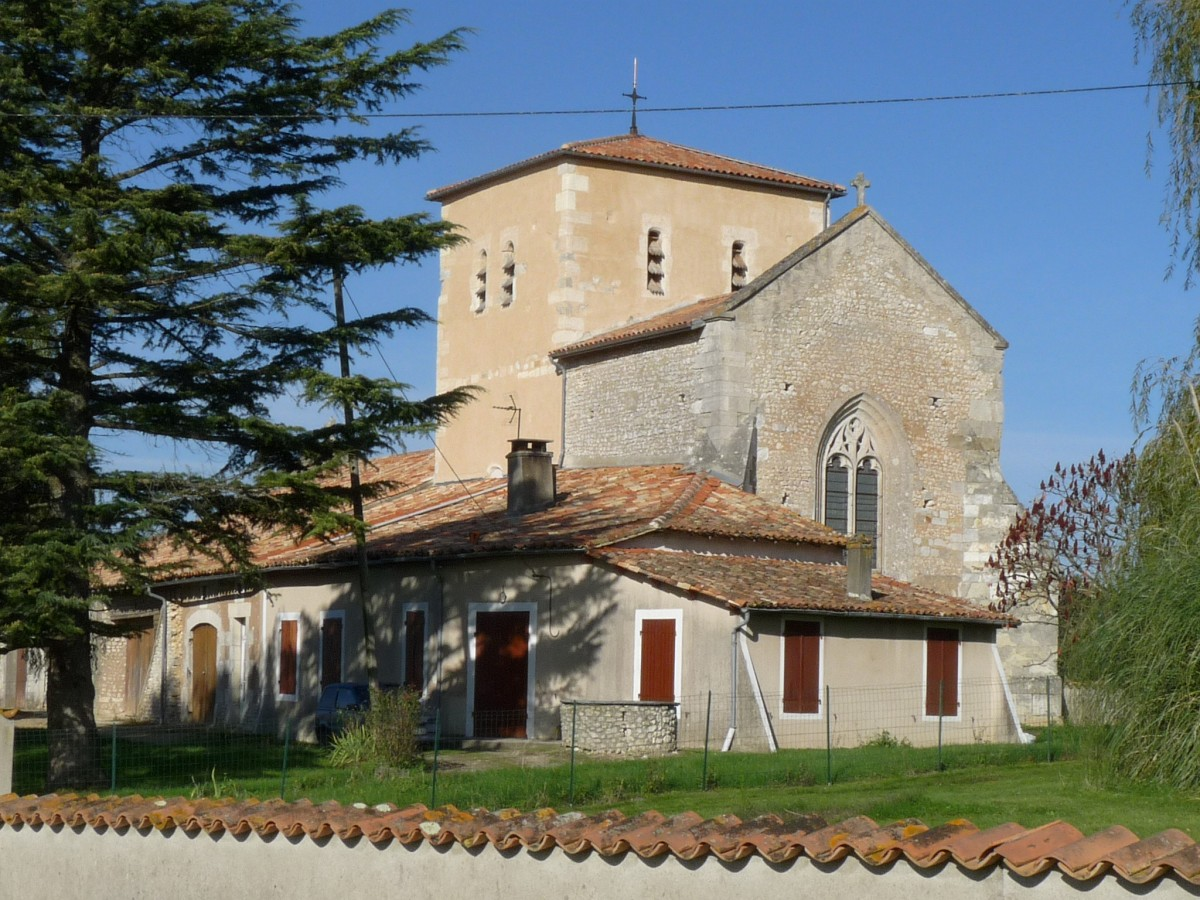
- The church in Sainte-Colombe
- Location of Sainte-Colombe
- Location within France Location within Nouvelle-Aquitaine
- Coordinates: 45°17′02″N 0°16′46″W
- Country: France
- Region: Nouvelle-Aquitaine
- Department: Charente-Maritime
- Arrondissement: Jonzac
- Canton: Les Trois Monts
- Intercommunality: Haute-Saintonge

Government
  - Mayor (2020–2026): Bernard Peruffo
- Area^{1}: 4.38 km^{2} (1.69 sq mi)
- Elevation: 125 m (410 ft)
- Highest elevation: 143 m (469 ft)
- Lowest elevation: 75 m (246 ft)
- Population (2023): 113
  - Density: 25.8/km^{2} (66.8/sq mi)
- Time zone: UTC+01:00 (CET)
  - Summer (DST): UTC+02:00 (CEST)
- INSEE/Postal code: 17319 /17220
- ^{1} French Land Register data, which excludes lakes, ponds, glaciers > 1 km^{2} (0.386 sq mi or 247 acres) and river estuaries.

Sainte-Colombe (French pronunciation: [sɛ̃t kɔlɔ̃b]) is a commune in the Charente-Maritime department in the Nouvelle-Aquitaine region in southwestern France.

== Geography ==
The Seugne forms most of the commune's southwestern border.

== Population ==
Historical population
Year	Pop.	±% p.a.
1968	139	—
1975	123	−1.73%
1982	127	+0.46%
1990	120	−0.71%
1999	114	−0.57%
2007	120	+0.64%
2012	112	−1.37%
2017	109	−0.54%
2023	113	+0.60%
Source: INSEE

== See also ==
- Communes of the Charente-Maritime department
