= Seugne =

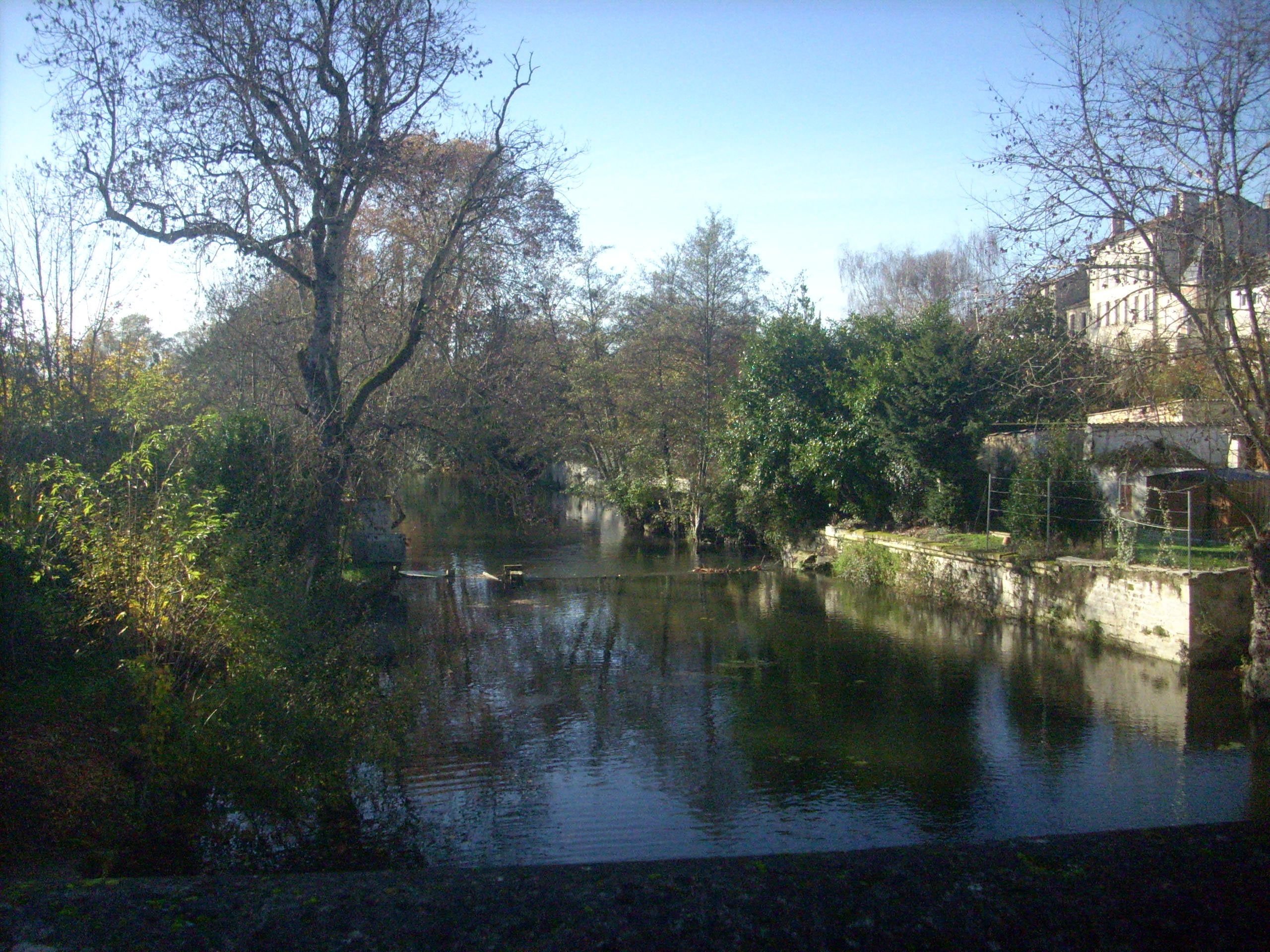
- The Seugne in Jonzac

- Location within France Location within Nouvelle-Aquitaine

Location
- Country: France

Physical characteristics
- Source
  - location: near Montlieu-la-Garde
  - coordinates: 45°14′55″N 00°16′53″W
  - elevation: 108 m (354 ft)
- Mouth
  - location: Charente
  - coordinates: 45°42′23″N 00°32′46″W
  - elevation: 4 m (13 ft)
- Length: 83.3 km (51.8 mi)
- Basin size: 902 km^{2} (348 sq mi)
- Discharge
  - average: 6.9 m^{3}/s (240 cu ft/s)

Basin features
- Progression: Charente→ Atlantic Ocean

The Seugne (French pronunciation: [sœɲ]) is an 83.3 km (51.8 mi) long river in the Charente-Maritime département, in western France, left tributary of the Charente. Its source is in the commune of Montlieu-la-Garde, 2 km (1.2 mi) west of the village. It flows generally north-northwest.

North from Colombiers, the Seugne splits in some branches, the main one flowing into the Charente at Courcoury, 2.5 km (1.6 mi) east of the village and the others 3, 4, 6 and 7 km downstream at Courcoury and Les Gonds.

== Communes it runs through ==
(ordered from source to mouth)

- Montlieu-la-Garde, Pouillac, Chepniers, Sainte-Colombe, Polignac, Chatenet, Le Pin, Mérignac, Sousmoulins, Pommiers-Moulons, Vibrac, Chaunac, Léoville, Fontaines-d'Ozillac, Saint-Médard, Champagnac, Jonzac, Saint-Germain-de-Lusignan, Lussac, Clion, Saint-Georges-Antignac, Mosnac, Fléac-sur-Seugne, Belluire, Pons, Bougneau, Saint-Léger, Colombiers, Montils, La Jard, Berneuil, Les Gonds, Courcoury,
