= Orignolles =

- Commune
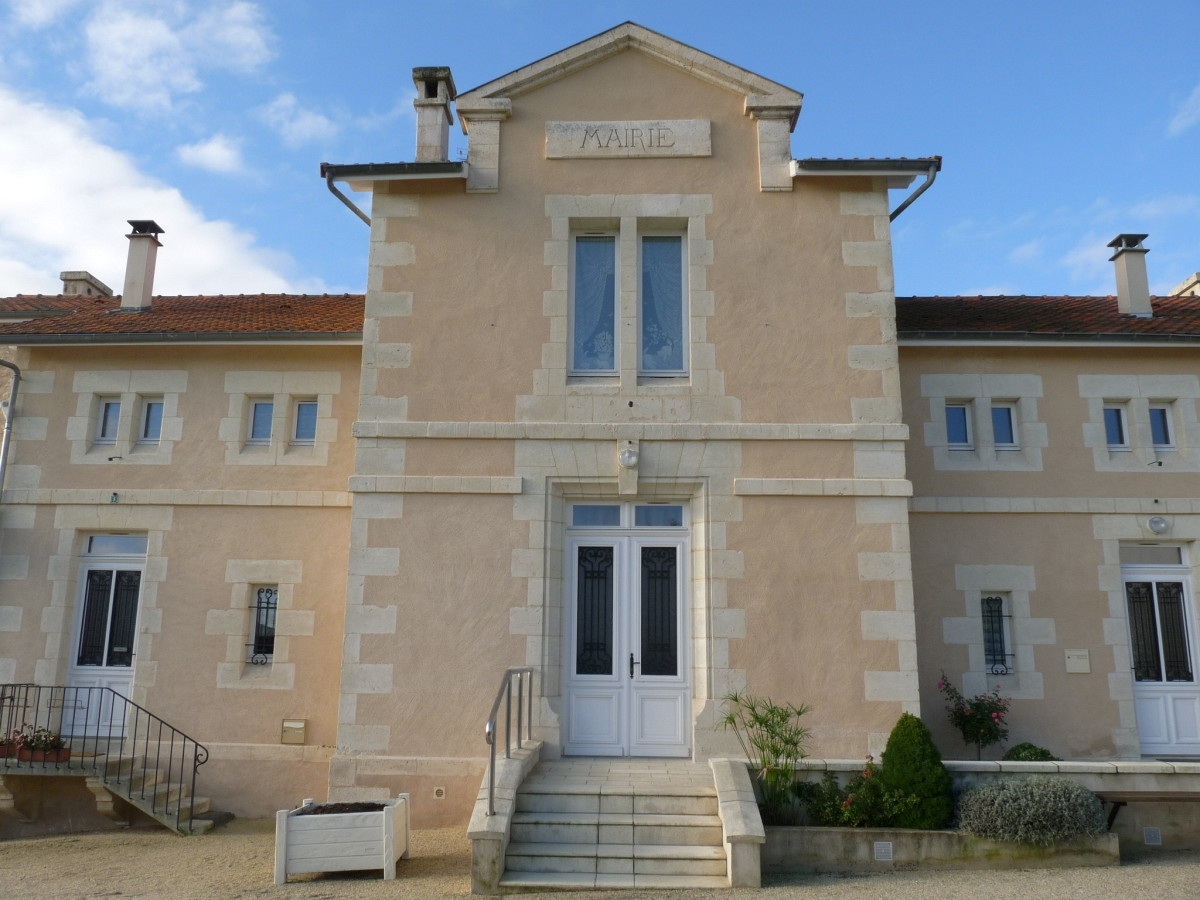
- The town hall in Orignolles
- Location of Orignolles
- Location within France Location within Nouvelle-Aquitaine
- Coordinates: 45°13′53″N 0°14′01″W
- Country: France
- Region: Nouvelle-Aquitaine
- Department: Charente-Maritime
- Arrondissement: Jonzac
- Canton: Les Trois Monts
- Intercommunality: Haute-Saintonge

Government
  - Mayor (2020–2026): Jean-Michel Rapiteau
- Area^{1}: 13.66 km^{2} (5.27 sq mi)
- Elevation: 107 m (351 ft)
- Highest elevation: 131 m (430 ft)
- Lowest elevation: 39 m (128 ft)
- Population (2023): 698
  - Density: 51.1/km^{2} (132/sq mi)
- Time zone: UTC+01:00 (CET)
  - Summer (DST): UTC+02:00 (CEST)
- INSEE/Postal code: 17269 /17220
- ^{1} French Land Register data, which excludes lakes, ponds, glaciers > 1 km^{2} (0.386 sq mi or 247 acres) and river estuaries.

Orignolles (French pronunciation: [ɔʁiɲɔl]) is a commune in the Charente-Maritime department in the Nouvelle-Aquitaine region in southwestern France.

== Population ==
Historical population
Year	Pop.	±% p.a.
1968	611	—
1975	609	−0.05%
1982	635	+0.60%
1990	653	+0.35%
1999	625	−0.49%
2007	611	−0.28%
2012	649	+1.21%
2017	676	+0.82%
2023	698	+0.54%
Source: INSEE

== See also ==
- Communes of the Charente-Maritime department
