= Montlieu-la-Garde =

- Commune
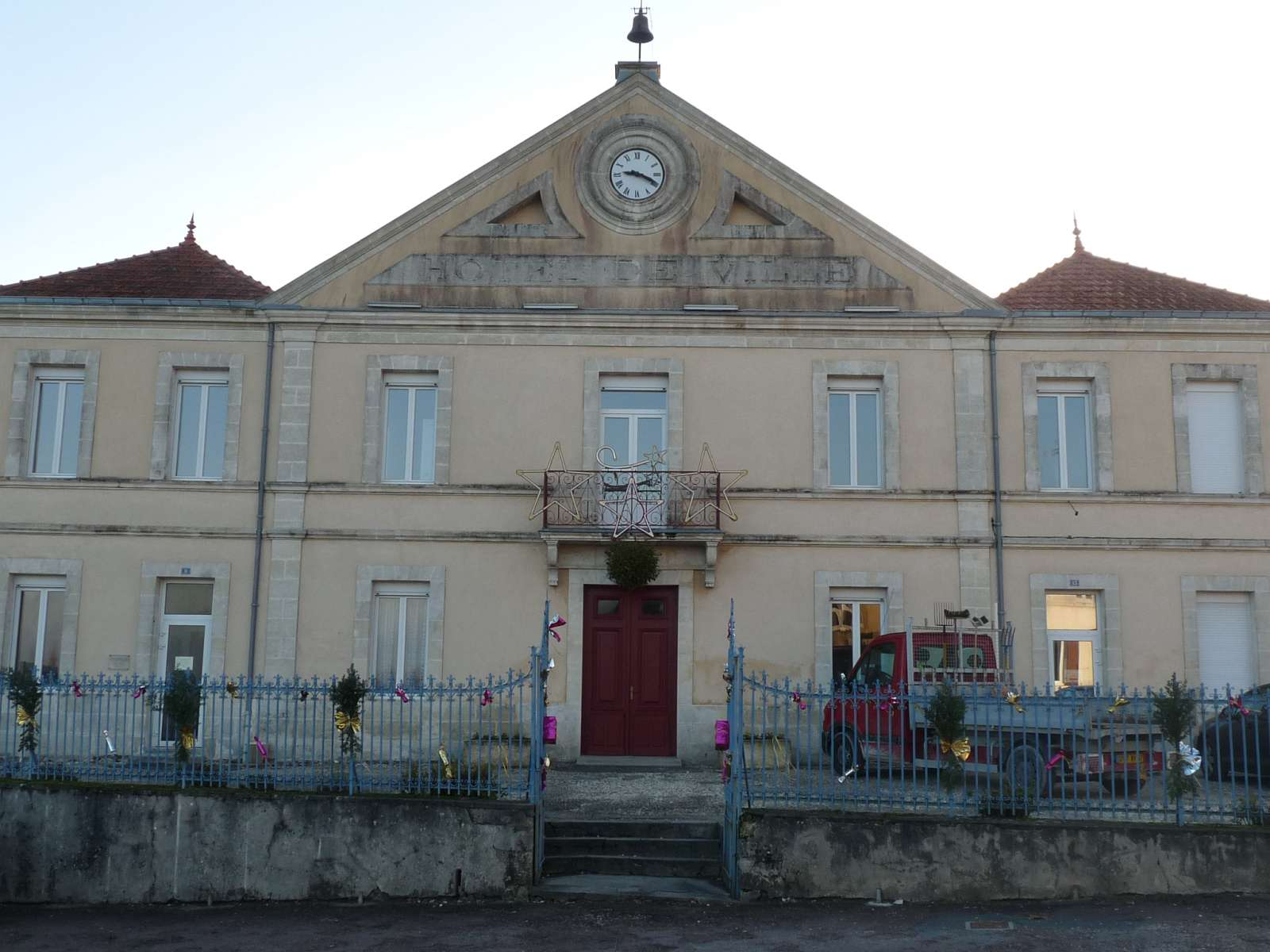
- Town hall

- Coat of arms
- Location of Montlieu-la-Garde
- Location within France Location within Nouvelle-Aquitaine
- Coordinates: 45°14′44″N 0°15′15″W
- Country: France
- Region: Nouvelle-Aquitaine
- Department: Charente-Maritime
- Arrondissement: Jonzac
- Canton: Les Trois Monts

Government
  - Mayor (2020–2026): Nicolas Morassutti
- Area^{1}: 31.6 km^{2} (12.2 sq mi)
- Elevation: 145 m (476 ft)
- Highest elevation: 147 m (482 ft)
- Lowest elevation: 52 m (171 ft)
- Population (2023): 1,310
  - Density: 41.5/km^{2} (107/sq mi)
- Time zone: UTC+01:00 (CET)
  - Summer (DST): UTC+02:00 (CEST)
- INSEE/Postal code: 17243 /17210
- ^{1} French Land Register data, which excludes lakes, ponds, glaciers > 1 km^{2} (0.386 sq mi or 247 acres) and river estuaries.

Montlieu-la-Garde (French pronunciation: [mɔ̃ljø la gaʁd]) is a commune in the Charente-Maritime department in southwestern France. The commune was formed in 1965 by the merger of the former communes Montlieu and La Garde.

== Geography ==
The source of the Seugne is in the commune.

== Population ==
Historical population
Year	Pop.	±% p.a.
1968	1,469	—
1975	1,317	−1.55%
1982	1,289	−0.31%
1990	1,326	+0.35%
1999	1,275	−0.43%
2007	1,324	+0.47%
2012	1,329	+0.08%
2017	1,264	−1.00%
2023	1,310	+0.60%
Source: INSEE

== See also ==
- Communes of the Charente-Maritime department
