= Polignac, Charente-Maritime =

Polignac
- Commune
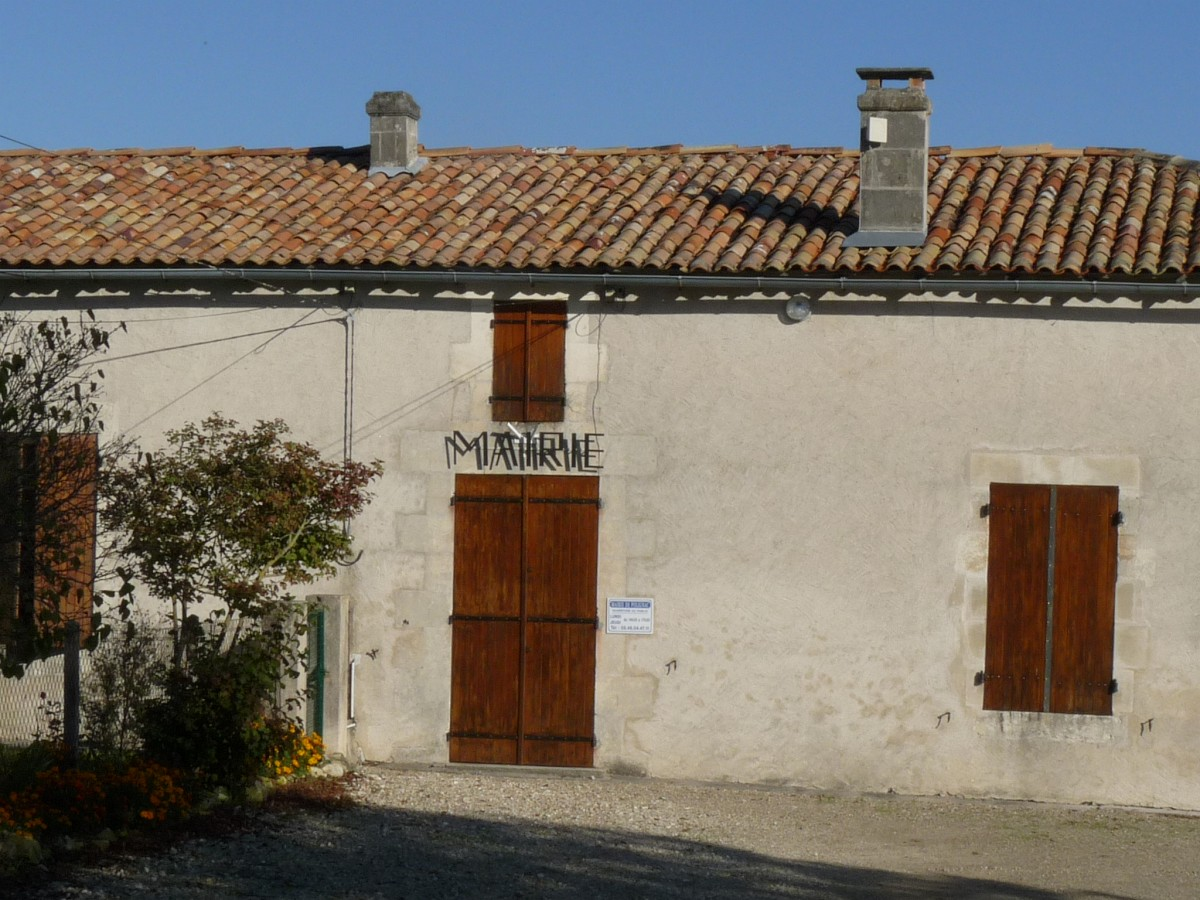
- The town hall in Polignac
- Location of Polignac
- Location within France Location within Nouvelle-Aquitaine
- Coordinates: 45°17′06″N 0°18′29″W
- Country: France
- Region: Nouvelle-Aquitaine
- Department: Charente-Maritime
- Arrondissement: Jonzac
- Canton: Les Trois Monts
- Intercommunality: Haute-Saintonge

Government
  - Mayor (2020–2026): Jackie Micheau
- Area^{1}: 4.64 km^{2} (1.79 sq mi)
- Elevation: 110 m (360 ft)
- Highest elevation: 123 m (404 ft)
- Lowest elevation: 69 m (226 ft)
- Population (2023): 161
  - Density: 34.7/km^{2} (89.9/sq mi)
- Time zone: UTC+01:00 (CET)
  - Summer (DST): UTC+02:00 (CEST)
- INSEE/Postal code: 17281 /17220
- ^{1} French Land Register data, which excludes lakes, ponds, glaciers > 1 km^{2} (0.386 sq mi or 247 acres) and river estuaries.

Polignac (French pronunciation: [pɔliɲak]) is a commune in the Charente-Maritime in the department in the Nouvelle-Aquitaine region in southwestern France.

== Geography ==
The Seugne forms most of the commune's eastern border.

== Population ==
Historical population
| Year | Pop. | ±% p.a. |
|---|---|---|
| 1968 | 192 | — |
| 1975 | 175 | −1.32% |
| 1982 | 125 | −4.69% |
| 1990 | 119 | −0.61% |
| 1999 | 108 | −1.07% |
| 2007 | 128 | +2.15% |
| 2012 | 159 | +4.43% |
| 2017 | 170 | +1.35% |
| 2023 | 161 | −0.90% |
Source: INSEE

== See also ==
- Communes of the Charente-Maritime department
