= Fontaines-d'Ozillac =

- Commune
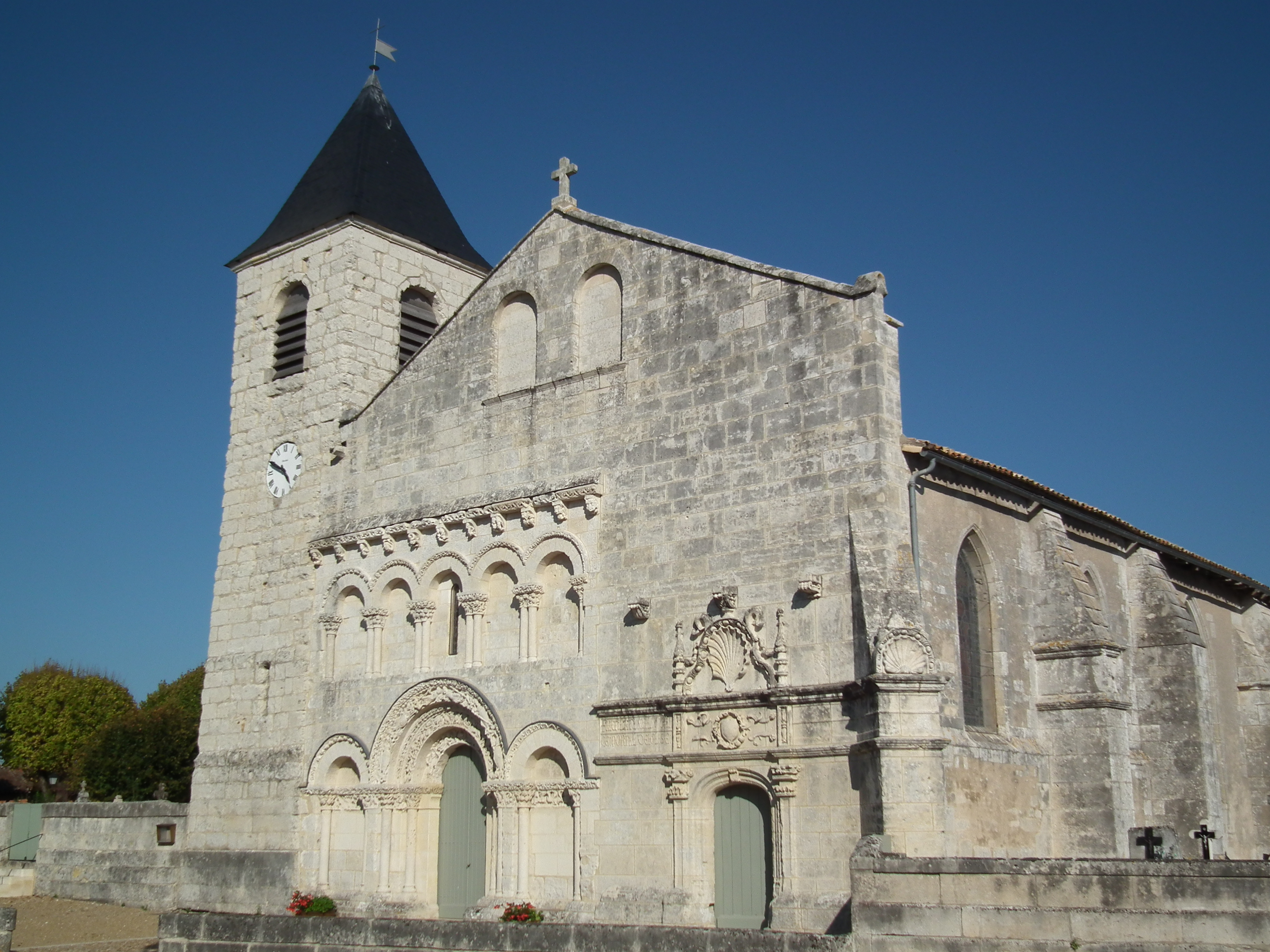
- The church in Fontaines-d'Ozillac
- Location of Fontaines-d'Ozillac
- Location within France Location within Nouvelle-Aquitaine
- Coordinates: 45°23′12″N 0°22′43″W
- Country: France
- Region: Nouvelle-Aquitaine
- Department: Charente-Maritime
- Arrondissement: Jonzac
- Canton: Jonzac

Government
  - Mayor (2020–2026): Marie Giraudeau
- Area^{1}: 13.87 km^{2} (5.36 sq mi)
- Highest elevation: 93 m (305 ft)
- Lowest elevation: 38 m (125 ft)
- Population (2023): 510
  - Density: 37/km^{2} (95/sq mi)
- Time zone: UTC+01:00 (CET)
  - Summer (DST): UTC+02:00 (CEST)
- INSEE/Postal code: 17163 /17500
- ^{1} French Land Register data, which excludes lakes, ponds, glaciers > 1 km^{2} (0.386 sq mi or 247 acres) and river estuaries.

Fontaines-d'Ozillac (French pronunciation: [fɔ̃tɛn dozijak]) is a commune in the Charente-Maritime department in southwestern France.

== Geography ==
The river Seugne forms most of the commune's eastern border.

== Population ==
Historical population
Year	Pop.	±% p.a.
1968	442	—
1975	378	−2.21%
1982	329	−1.96%
1990	370	+1.48%
1999	394	+0.70%
2007	467	+2.15%
2012	537	+2.83%
2017	520	−0.64%
2023	510	−0.32%
Source: INSEE

== See also ==
- Communes of the Charente-Maritime department
