= Clion, Charente-Maritime =

Clion
- Commune
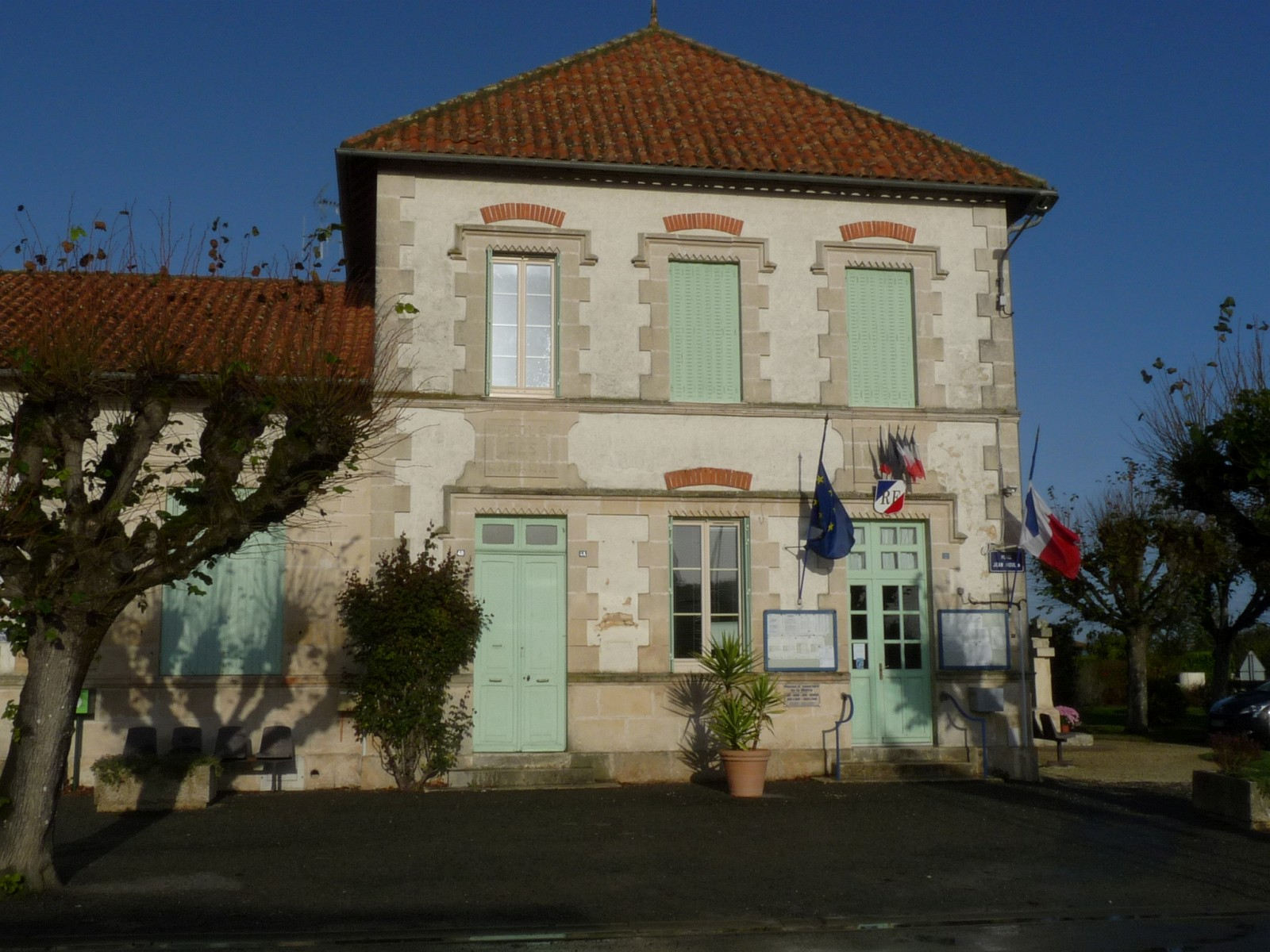
- The town hall in Clion
- Location of Clion
- Location within France Location within Nouvelle-Aquitaine
- Coordinates: 45°28′49″N 0°30′00″W
- Country: France
- Region: Nouvelle-Aquitaine
- Department: Charente-Maritime
- Arrondissement: Jonzac
- Canton: Jonzac
- Intercommunality: Haute-Saintonge

Government
  - Mayor (2020–2026): Isabelle Tardy
- Area^{1}: 15.84 km^{2} (6.12 sq mi)
- Highest elevation: 43 m (141 ft)
- Lowest elevation: 20 m (66 ft)
- Population (2023): 843
  - Density: 53.2/km^{2} (138/sq mi)
- Time zone: UTC+01:00 (CET)
  - Summer (DST): UTC+02:00 (CEST)
- INSEE/Postal code: 17111 /17240
- ^{1} French Land Register data, which excludes lakes, ponds, glaciers > 1 km^{2} (0.386 sq mi or 247 acres) and river estuaries.

Clion (French pronunciation: [klijɔ̃]) is a commune in the Charente-Maritime department in southwestern France.

== Geography ==
The village lies on the west bank of the Seugne, which forms most of the commune's northeastern border.

== Population ==
Historical population
Year	Pop.	±% p.a.
1968	679	—
1975	596	−1.85%
1982	715	+2.63%
1990	743	+0.48%
1999	723	−0.30%
2007	751	+0.48%
2012	826	+1.92%
2017	813	−0.32%
2023	843	+0.61%
Source: INSEE

== See also ==
- Communes of the Charente-Maritime department
