= Canton of Mirambeau =

Coordinates: 45°23′N 0°34′W

Mirambeau
- Former canton
- Interactive map of Mirambeau
- Country: France
- Region: Nouvelle-Aquitaine
- Department: Charente-Maritime
- No. of communes: {{{nbcomm}}}
- Disbanded: 2015
- Area: 266.9 km^{2} (103.1 sq mi)
- Population (2012): 7,815
  - Density: 29.28/km^{2} (75.84/sq mi)

The Canton of Mirambeau is a former canton of the Charente-Maritime département, in France. It was disbanded following the French canton reorganisation which came into effect in March 2015. It had 7,815 inhabitants (2012). The lowest point is the Atlantic Ocean at the commune of Saint-Sorlin-de-Conac, the highest point is at Salignac-de-Mirambeau at 111 m, the average or the centre is 46 m. The most populated commune was Mirambeau with 1,491 inhabitants (2012).

== Communes of Mirambeau ==
The canton comprised the following communes:

- Allas-Bocage
- Boisredon
- Consac
- Courpignac
- Mirambeau
- Nieul-le-Virouil
- Saint-Bonnet-sur-Gironde
- Saint-Ciers-du-Taillon
- Saint-Dizant-du-Bois
- Saint-Georges-des-Agoûts
- Saint-Hilaire-du-Bois
- Saint-Martial-de-Mirambeau
- Sainte-Ramée
- Saint-Sorlin-de-Conac
- Saint-Thomas-de-Conac
- Salignac-de-Mirambeau
- Semillac
- Semoussac
- Soubran

== Population history ==
Year	Population
1962	7,894
1968	8,522
1975	7,571
1982	7,363
1990	7,192
1999	7,230
2008	7,551
2012	7,815

== See also ==
- Cantons of the Charente-Maritime department
