= Mazerolles =

Mazerolles may refer to the following places in France:

- Mazerolles, Charente, a commune in the department of Charente
- Mazerolles, Charente-Maritime, a commune in the department of Charente-Maritime
- Mazerolles, Landes, a commune in the department of Landes
- Mazerolles, Pyrénées-Atlantiques, a commune in the department of Pyrénées-Atlantiques
- Mazerolles, Hautes-Pyrénées, a commune in the department of Hautes-Pyrénées
- Mazerolles, Vienne, a commune in the department of Vienne
- Mazerolles-du-Razès, a commune in the department of Aude
- Mazerolles-le-Salin, a commune in the department of Doubs
