= Plassac =

Plassac is the name of several communes in France:

- Plassac, Charente-Maritime, in the Charente-Maritime department
- Plassac, Gironde, in the Gironde department
