= Mirambeau =

Mirambeau may refer to the following places in France:

- Mirambeau, Charente-Maritime, a commune in the Charente-Maritime département
- Canton of Mirambeau, a canton in the Charente-Maritime département
- Mirambeau, Haute-Garonne, a commune in the Haute-Garonne département
