= Bougneau =

- Commune
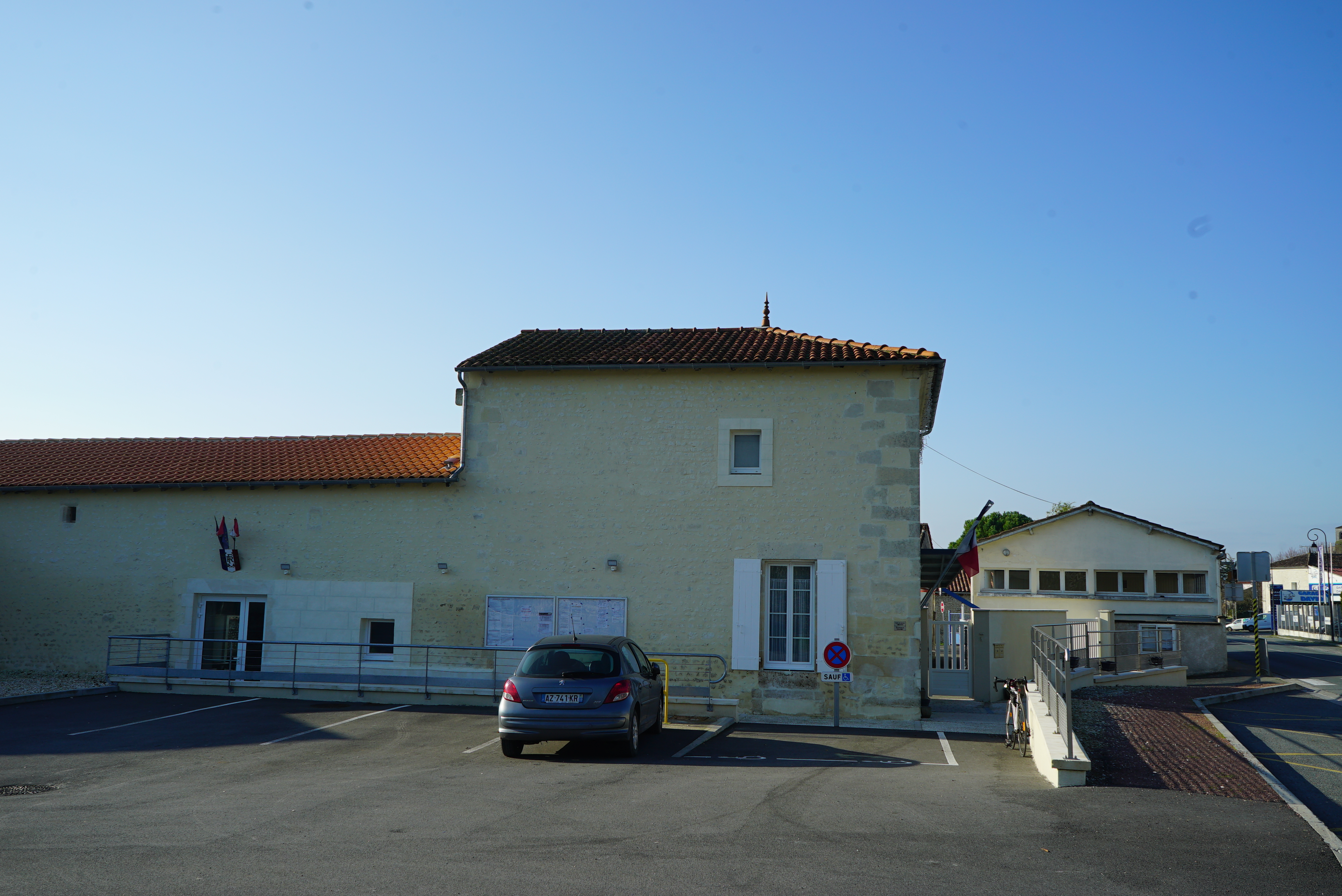
- The town hall in Bougneau
- Location of Bougneau
- Location within France Location within Nouvelle-Aquitaine
- Coordinates: 45°35′52″N 0°30′47″W
- Country: France
- Region: Nouvelle-Aquitaine
- Department: Charente-Maritime
- Arrondissement: Jonzac
- Canton: Pons
- Intercommunality: Haute-Saintonge

Government
  - Mayor (2020–2026): Jean-Marie Tonneau
- Area^{1}: 14.54 km^{2} (5.61 sq mi)
- Highest elevation: 102 m (335 ft)
- Lowest elevation: 7 m (23 ft)
- Population (2023): 655
  - Density: 45.0/km^{2} (117/sq mi)
- Time zone: UTC+01:00 (CET)
  - Summer (DST): UTC+02:00 (CEST)
- INSEE/Postal code: 17056 /17800
- ^{1} French Land Register data, which excludes lakes, ponds, glaciers > 1 km^{2} (0.386 sq mi or 247 acres) and river estuaries.

Bougneau (French pronunciation: [buɲo]) is a commune in the Charente-Maritime department in southwestern France.

== Geography ==
The Seugne forms all of the commune's western border.

== Population ==
Historical population
Year	Pop.	±% p.a.
1968	490	—
1975	476	−0.41%
1982	459	−0.52%
1990	450	−0.25%
1999	430	−0.50%
2007	510	+2.16%
2012	589	+2.92%
2017	605	+0.54%
2023	655	+1.33%
Source: INSEE

== See also ==
- Communes of the Charente-Maritime department
