= Saint-Grégoire-d'Ardennes =

- Commune
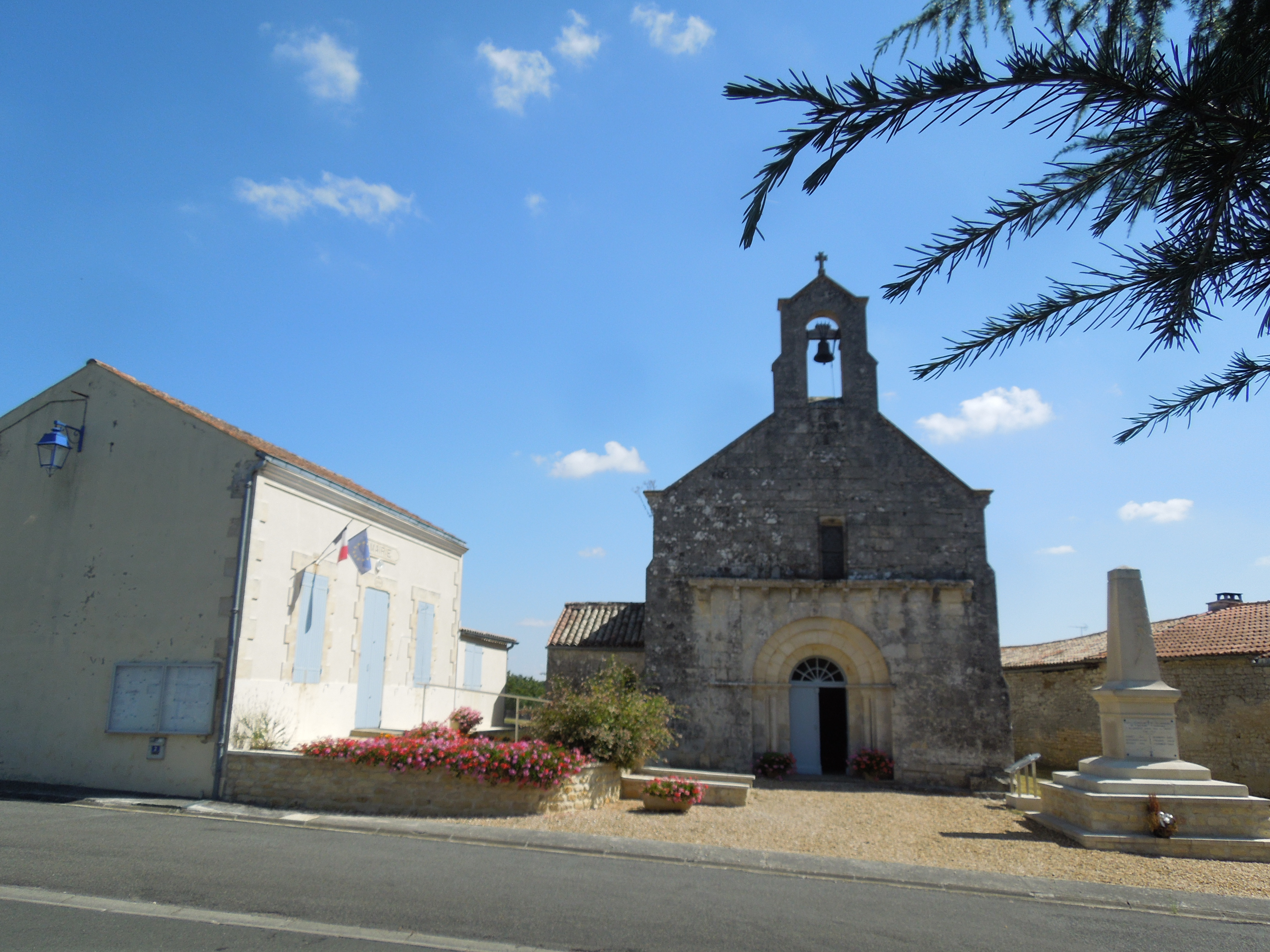
- Town hall, church and war memorial
- Location of Saint-Grégoire-d'Ardennes
- Location within France Location within Nouvelle-Aquitaine
- Coordinates: 45°30′23″N 0°29′38″W
- Country: France
- Region: Nouvelle-Aquitaine
- Department: Charente-Maritime
- Arrondissement: Jonzac
- Canton: Pons
- Intercommunality: Haute-Saintonge

Government
  - Mayor (2020–2026): Raymond Tessonneau
- Area^{1}: 3.50 km^{2} (1.35 sq mi)
- Elevation: 25 m (82 ft)
- Highest elevation: 60 m (200 ft)
- Lowest elevation: 17 m (56 ft)
- Population (2023): 143
  - Density: 40.9/km^{2} (106/sq mi)
- Time zone: UTC+01:00 (CET)
  - Summer (DST): UTC+02:00 (CEST)
- INSEE/Postal code: 17343 /17240
- ^{1} French Land Register data, which excludes lakes, ponds, glaciers > 1 km^{2} (0.386 sq mi or 247 acres) and river estuaries.

Saint-Grégoire-d'Ardennes (French pronunciation: [sɛ̃ ɡʁeɡwaʁ daʁdɛn]) is a commune in the Charente-Maritime department in southwestern France.

== Population ==
Historical population
Year	Pop.	±% p.a.
1968	140	—
1975	142	+0.20%
1982	153	+1.07%
1990	134	−1.64%
1999	118	−1.40%
2007	128	+1.02%
2012	140	+1.81%
2017	151	+1.52%
2023	143	−0.90%
Source: INSEE

== See also ==
- Communes of the Charente-Maritime department
