= Canton of Pons =

Coordinates: 45.58°N 0.55°W

The canton of Pons is an administrative division of the Charente-Maritime department, western France. Its borders were modified at the French canton reorganisation which came into effect in March 2015. Its seat is in Pons.

It consists of the following communes:

1. Avy
2. Belluire
3. Biron
4. Bois
5. Boisredon
6. Bougneau
7. Chadenac
8. Champagnolles
9. Courpignac
10. Échebrune
11. Fléac-sur-Seugne
12. Givrezac
13. Lorignac
14. Marignac
15. Mazerolles
16. Mirambeau
17. Mosnac
18. Plassac
19. Pons
20. Saint-Bonnet-sur-Gironde
21. Saint-Ciers-du-Taillon
22. Saint-Dizant-du-Gua
23. Sainte-Ramée
24. Saint-Fort-sur-Gironde
25. Saint-Genis-de-Saintonge
26. Saint-Georges-des-Agoûts
27. Saint-Germain-du-Seudre
28. Saint-Grégoire-d'Ardennes
29. Saint-Léger
30. Saint-Martial-de-Mirambeau
31. Saint-Palais-de-Phiolin
32. Saint-Quantin-de-Rançanne
33. Saint-Seurin-de-Palenne
34. Saint-Sorlin-de-Conac
35. Saint-Thomas-de-Conac
36. Salignac-de-Mirambeau
37. Semillac
38. Semoussac
39. Soubran
