= Mosnac, Charente-Maritime =

Mosnac
- Commune
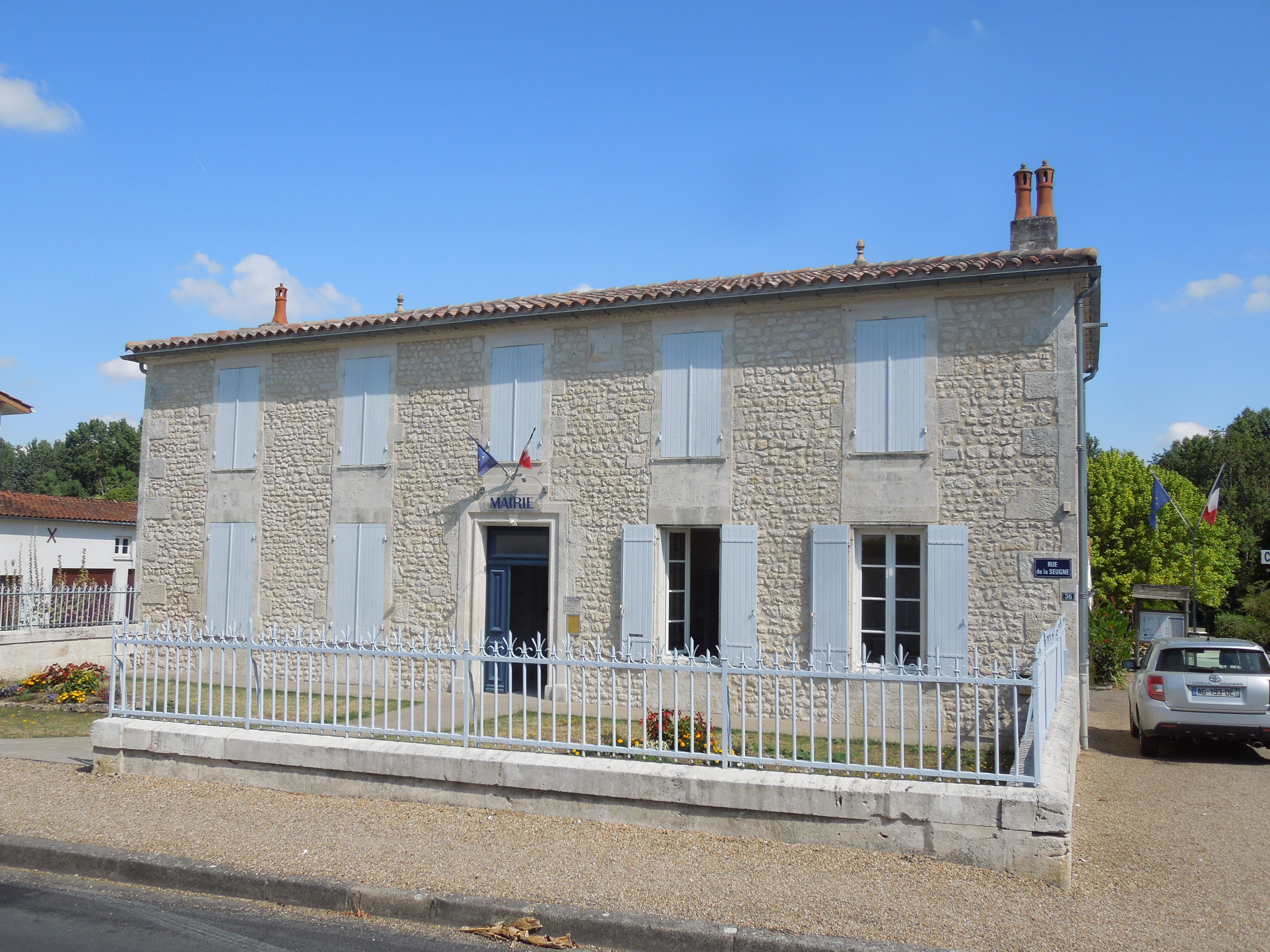
- The town hall in Mosnac
- Location of Mosnac
- Location within France Location within Nouvelle-Aquitaine
- Coordinates: 45°30′23″N 0°31′19″W
- Country: France
- Region: Nouvelle-Aquitaine
- Department: Charente-Maritime
- Arrondissement: Jonzac
- Canton: Pons
- Intercommunality: Haute-Saintonge

Government
  - Mayor (2020–2026): Didier Gervreau
- Area^{1}: 12.44 km^{2} (4.80 sq mi)
- Highest elevation: 39 m (128 ft)
- Lowest elevation: 17 m (56 ft)
- Population (2023): 494
  - Density: 39.7/km^{2} (103/sq mi)
- Time zone: UTC+01:00 (CET)
  - Summer (DST): UTC+02:00 (CEST)
- INSEE/Postal code: 17250 /17240
- ^{1} French Land Register data, which excludes lakes, ponds, glaciers > 1 km^{2} (0.386 sq mi or 247 acres) and river estuaries.

Mosnac (French pronunciation: [monak]) is a commune in the Charente-Maritime department in southwestern France.

== Geography ==
The village lies on the left bank of the Seugne, which forms all of the commune's northeastern border.

== Population ==
Historical population
Year	Pop.	±% p.a.
1968	467	—
1975	436	−0.98%
1982	439	+0.10%
1990	431	−0.23%
1999	448	+0.43%
2007	468	+0.55%
2012	465	−0.13%
2017	466	+0.04%
2023	494	+0.98%
Source: INSEE

== See also ==
- Communes of the Charente-Maritime department
