= Saint-Seurin-de-Palenne =

Saint-Seurin-de-Palene
- Commune
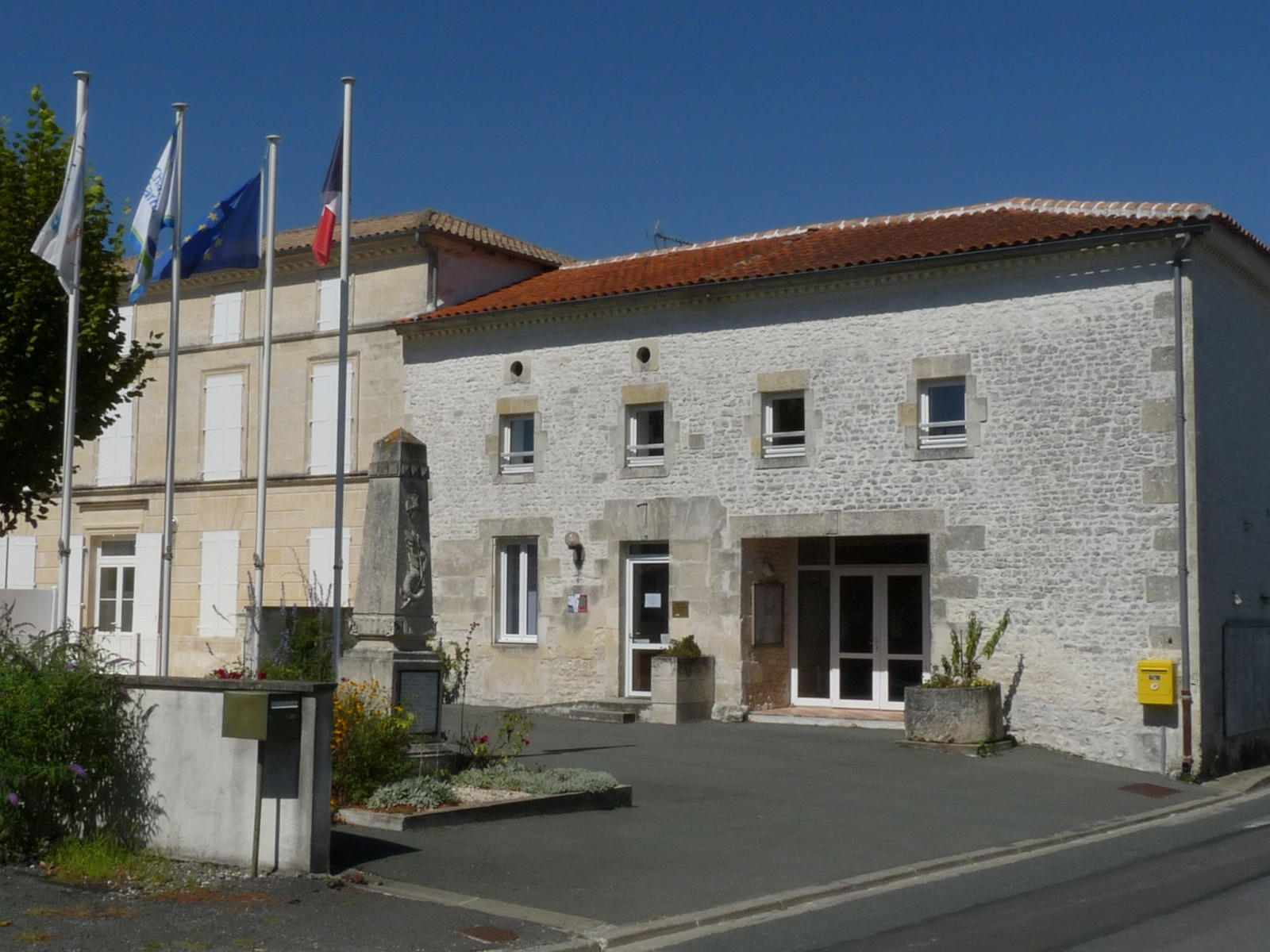
- The town hall in Saint-Seurin-de-Palenne

- Coat of arms
- Location of Saint-Seurin-de-Palene
- Location within France Location within Nouvelle-Aquitaine
- Coordinates: 45°37′33″N 0°30′46″W
- Country: France
- Region: Nouvelle-Aquitaine
- Department: Charente-Maritime
- Arrondissement: Jonzac
- Canton: Pons
- Intercommunality: Haute-Saintonge

Government
  - Mayor (2020–2026): Yves Archambaud
- Area^{1}: 4.03 km^{2} (1.56 sq mi)
- Elevation: 20 m (66 ft)
- Highest elevation: 52 m (171 ft)
- Lowest elevation: 8 m (26 ft)
- Population (2023): 167
  - Density: 41.4/km^{2} (107/sq mi)
- Time zone: UTC+01:00 (CET)
  - Summer (DST): UTC+02:00 (CEST)
- INSEE/Postal code: 17398 /17800
- ^{1} French Land Register data, which excludes lakes, ponds, glaciers > 1 km^{2} (0.386 sq mi or 247 acres) and river estuaries.

Saint-Seurin-de-Palenne (French pronunciation: [sɛ̃ sœʁɛ̃ də palɛn]) is a commune in the Charente-Maritime department in southwestern France.

== Population ==
Historical population
Year	Pop.	±% p.a.
1968	145	—
1975	128	−1.77%
1982	138	+1.08%
1990	164	+2.18%
1999	149	−1.06%
2007	152	+0.25%
2012	159	+0.90%
2017	165	+0.74%
2023	167	+0.20%
Source: INSEE

== See also ==
- Communes of the Charente-Maritime department
