= Givrezac =

- Commune
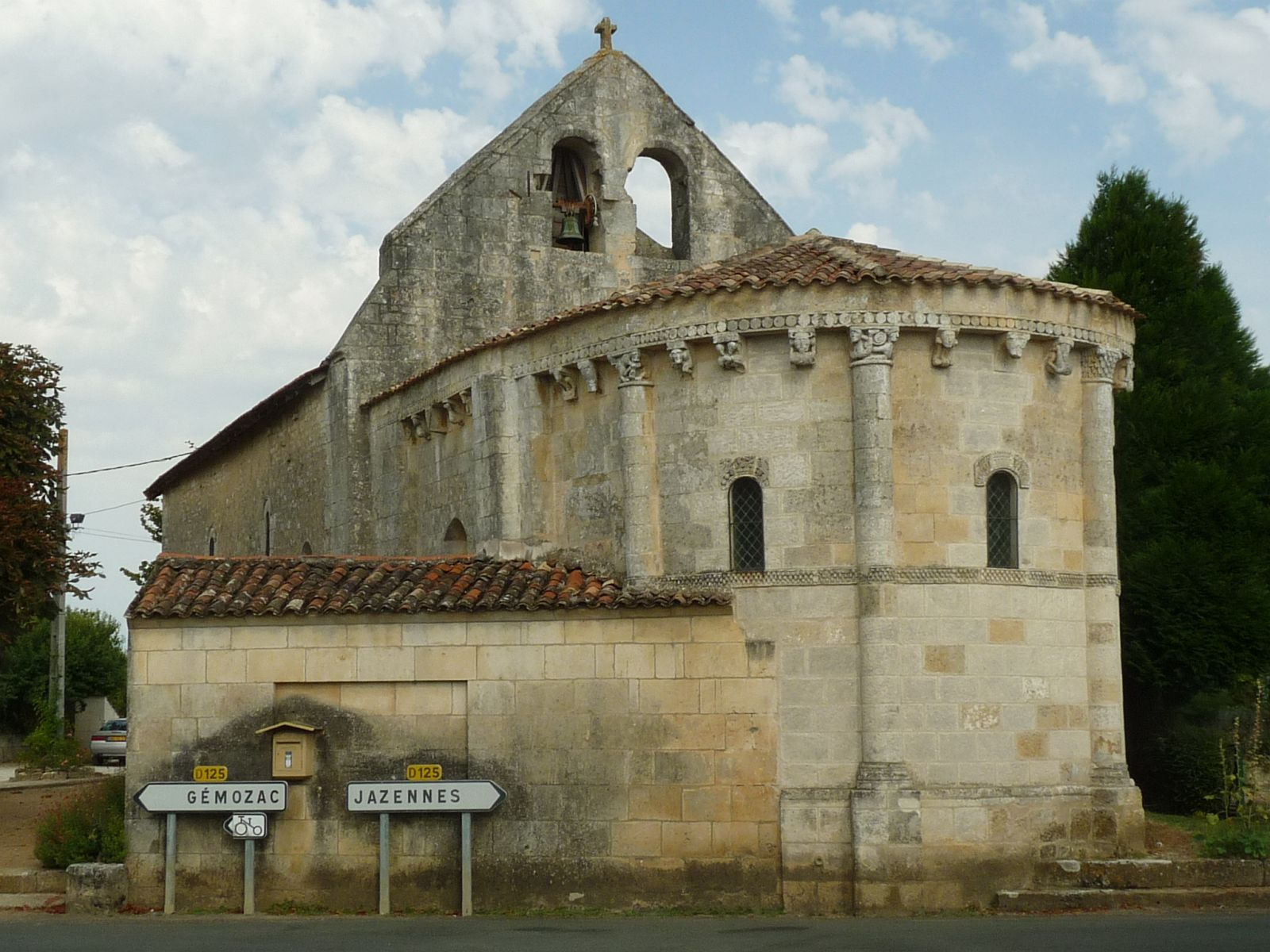
- The church in Givrezac
- Location of Givrezac
- Location within France Location within Nouvelle-Aquitaine
- Coordinates: 45°32′35″N 0°37′44″W
- Country: France
- Region: Nouvelle-Aquitaine
- Department: Charente-Maritime
- Arrondissement: Jonzac
- Canton: Pons
- Intercommunality: Haute-Saintonge

Government
  - Mayor (2020–2026): Claude Boisselet
- Area^{1}: 2.70 km^{2} (1.04 sq mi)
- Highest elevation: 44 m (144 ft)
- Lowest elevation: 37 m (121 ft)
- Population (2023): 74
  - Density: 27/km^{2} (71/sq mi)
- Time zone: UTC+01:00 (CET)
  - Summer (DST): UTC+02:00 (CEST)
- INSEE/Postal code: 17178 /17260
- ^{1} French Land Register data, which excludes lakes, ponds, glaciers > 1 km^{2} (0.386 sq mi or 247 acres) and river estuaries.

Givrezac (French pronunciation: [ʒivʁəzak]) is a commune in the Charente-Maritime department in southwestern France.

== Population ==
Historical population
Year	Pop.	±% p.a.
1968	88	—
1975	79	−1.53%
1982	77	−0.37%
1990	59	−3.27%
1999	63	+0.73%
2007	63	+0.00%
2012	76	+3.82%
2017	68	−2.20%
2023	74	+1.42%
Source: INSEE

== See also ==
- Communes of the Charente-Maritime department
