= Saint-Léger, Charente-Maritime =

Saint-Léger
- Commune
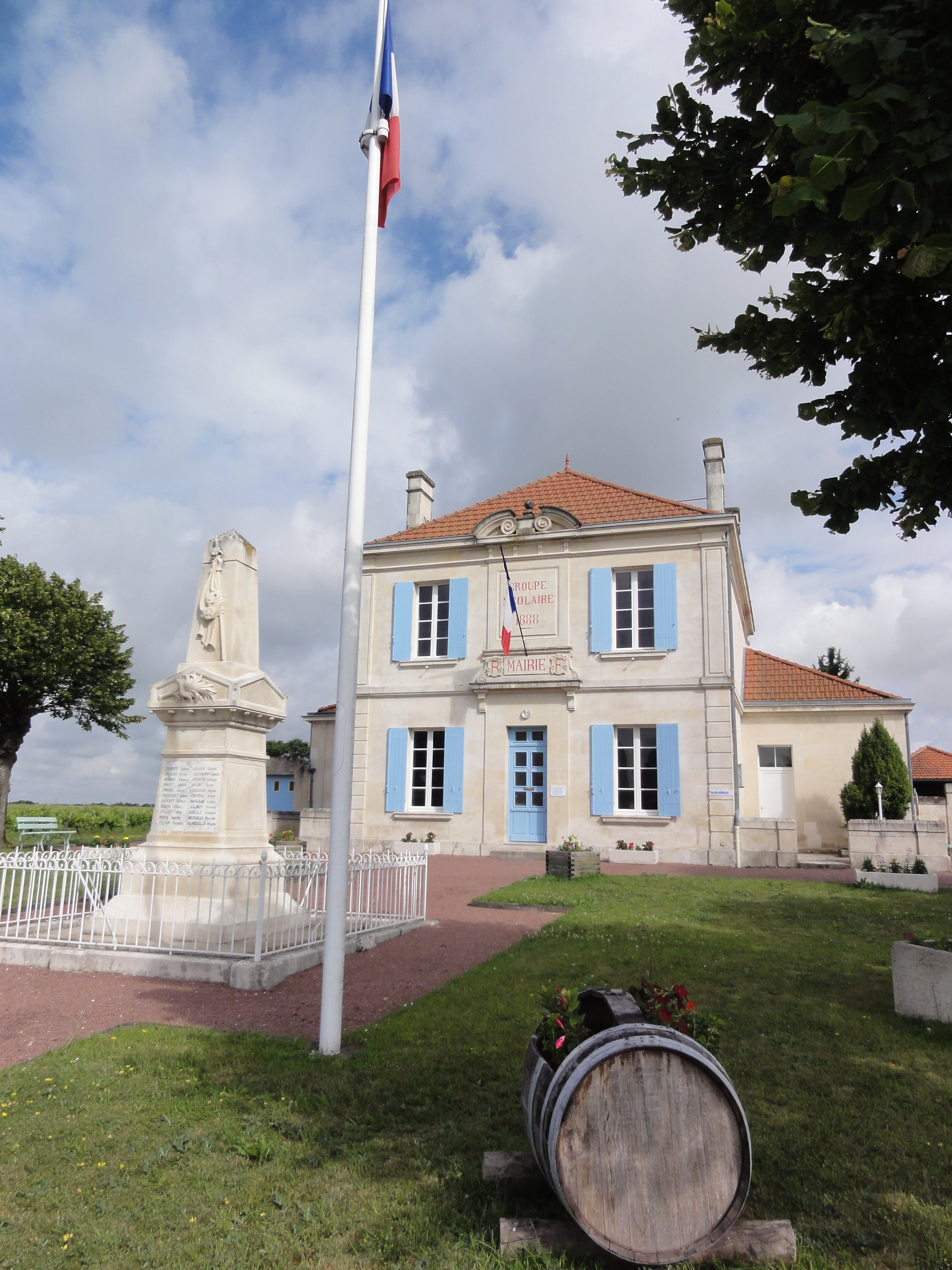
- Town hall and war memorial
- Location of Saint-Léger
- Location within France Location within Nouvelle-Aquitaine
- Coordinates: 45°37′20″N 0°34′54″W
- Country: France
- Region: Nouvelle-Aquitaine
- Department: Charente-Maritime
- Arrondissement: Jonzac
- Canton: Pons

Government
  - Mayor (2020–2026): David Defoulounoux
- Area^{1}: 15.88 km^{2} (6.13 sq mi)
- Elevation: 52 m (171 ft)
- Highest elevation: 67 m (220 ft)
- Lowest elevation: 7 m (23 ft)
- Population (2023): 679
  - Density: 42.8/km^{2} (111/sq mi)
- Time zone: UTC+01:00 (CET)
  - Summer (DST): UTC+02:00 (CEST)
- INSEE/Postal code: 17354 /17800
- ^{1} French Land Register data, which excludes lakes, ponds, glaciers > 1 km^{2} (0.386 sq mi or 247 acres) and river estuaries.

Saint-Léger (French pronunciation: [sɛ̃ leʒe]) is a commune in the Charente-Maritime department in southwestern France.

== Geography ==
The commune is traversed by the Seugne River.

== Population ==
Historical population
Year	Pop.	±% p.a.
1968	402	—
1975	375	−0.99%
1982	402	+1.00%
1990	461	+1.73%
1999	465	+0.10%
2007	562	+2.40%
2012	611	+1.69%
2017	632	+0.68%
2023	679	+1.20%
Source: INSEE

== See also ==
- Communes of the Charente-Maritime department
