= Marignac, Charente-Maritime =

Marignac
- Commune
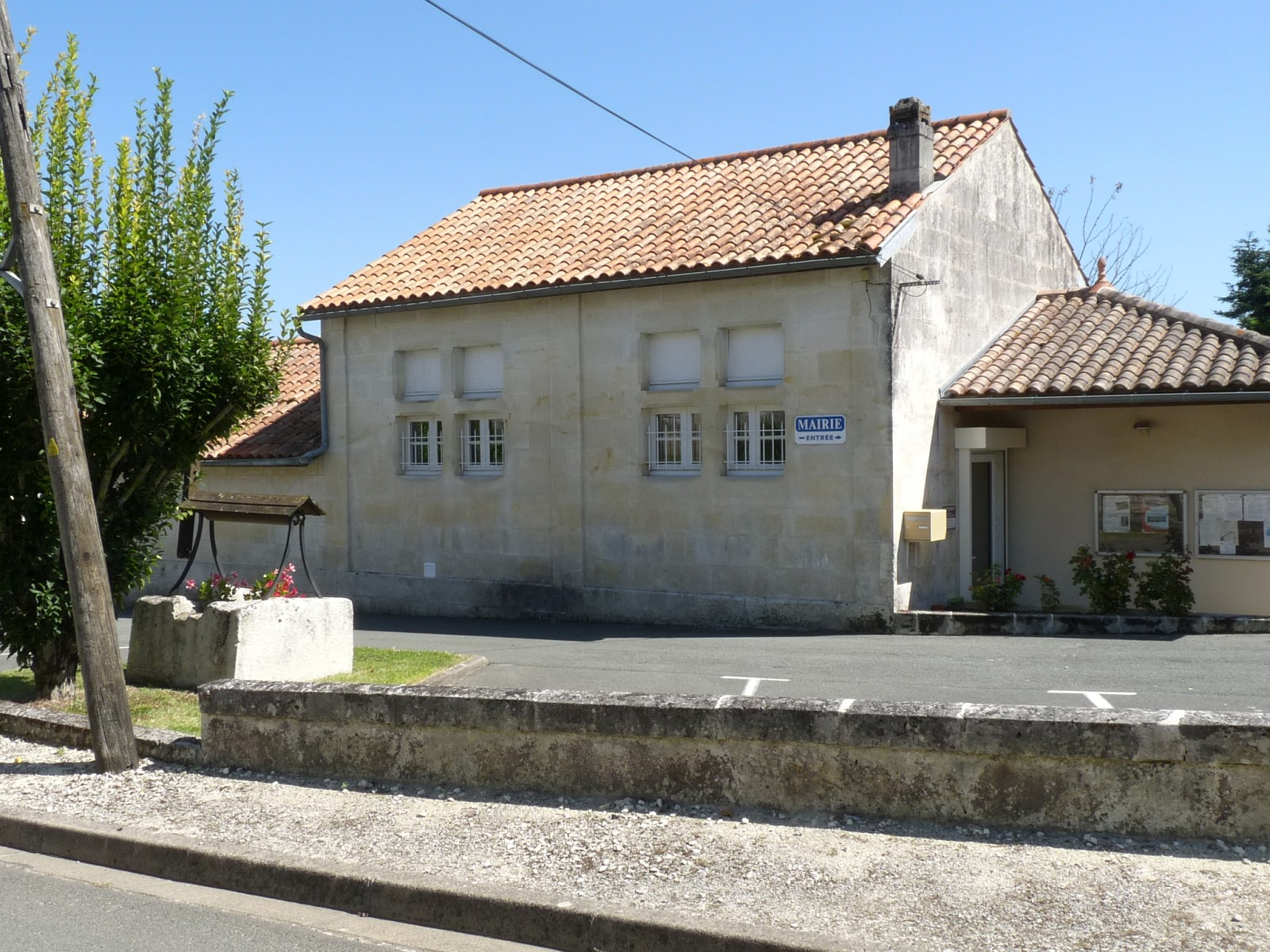
- The town hall in Marignac
- Location of Marignac
- Location within France Location within Nouvelle-Aquitaine
- Coordinates: 45°31′21″N 0°28′29″W
- Country: France
- Region: Nouvelle-Aquitaine
- Department: Charente-Maritime
- Arrondissement: Jonzac
- Canton: Pons
- Intercommunality: Haute-Saintonge

Government
  - Mayor (2020–2026): Bruno Deborde
- Area^{1}: 13.50 km^{2} (5.21 sq mi)
- Highest elevation: 90 m (300 ft)
- Lowest elevation: 20 m (66 ft)
- Population (2023): 412
  - Density: 30.5/km^{2} (79.0/sq mi)
- Time zone: UTC+01:00 (CET)
  - Summer (DST): UTC+02:00 (CEST)
- INSEE/Postal code: 17220 /17800
- ^{1} French Land Register data, which excludes lakes, ponds, glaciers > 1 km^{2} (0.386 sq mi or 247 acres) and river estuaries.

Marignac (French pronunciation: [maʁiɲak]) is a commune in the Charente-Maritime department in southwestern France.

== Population ==
Historical population
Year	Pop.	±% p.a.
1968	350	—
1975	355	+0.20%
1982	341	−0.57%
1990	347	+0.22%
1999	347	+0.00%
2007	384	+1.27%
2012	409	+1.27%
2017	422	+0.63%
2023	412	−0.40%
Source: INSEE

== See also ==
- Communes of the Charente-Maritime department
