= Saint-Quantin-de-Rançanne =

- Commune
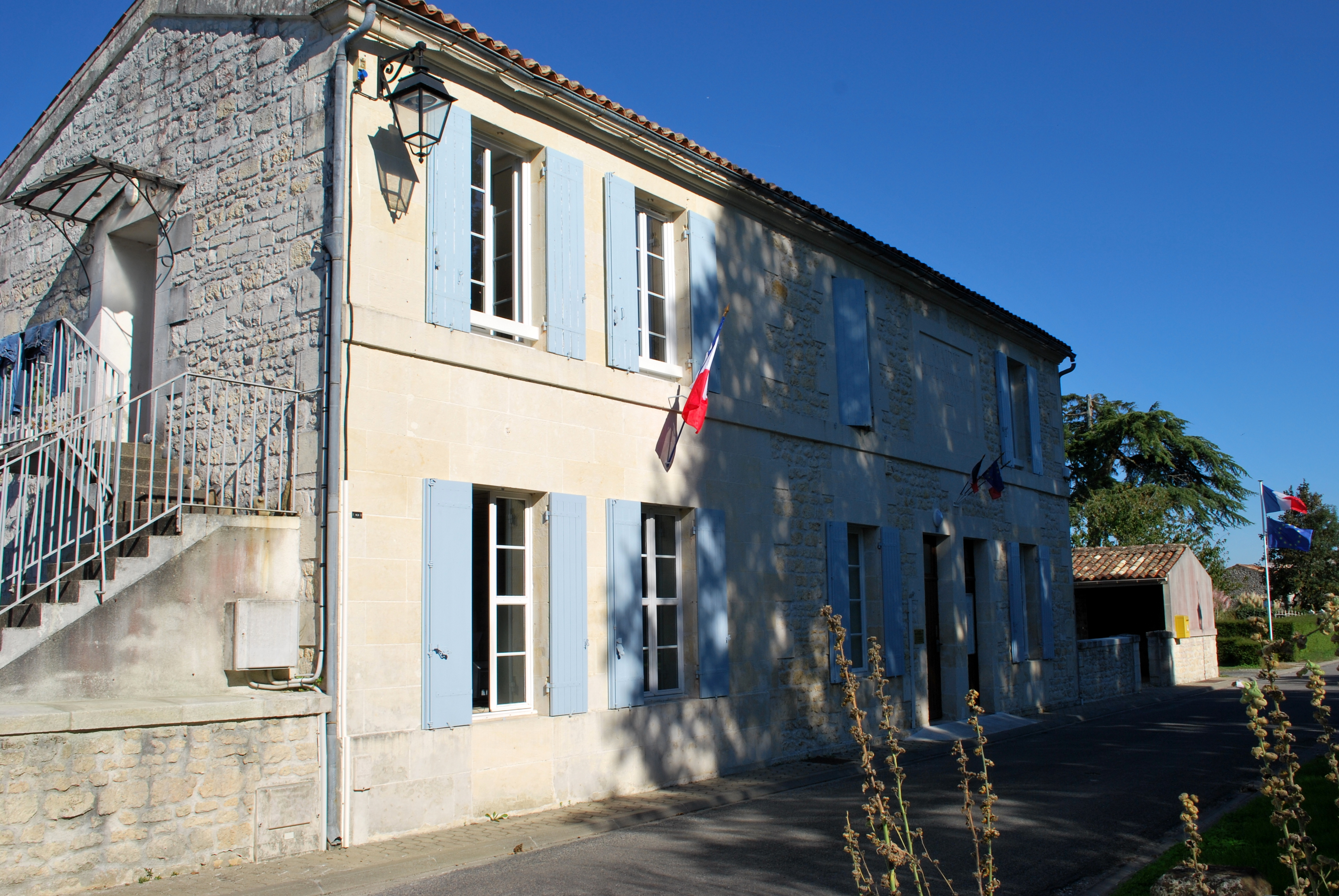
- The town hall in Saint-Quantin-de-Rançanne
- Location of Saint-Quantin-de-Rançanne
- Location within France Location within Nouvelle-Aquitaine
- Coordinates: 45°32′02″N 0°35′34″W
- Country: France
- Region: Nouvelle-Aquitaine
- Department: Charente-Maritime
- Arrondissement: Jonzac
- Canton: Pons
- Intercommunality: Haute-Saintonge

Government
  - Mayor (2020–2026): Jean-Pierre Bouchet
- Area^{1}: 9.11 km^{2} (3.52 sq mi)
- Elevation: 40 m (130 ft)
- Highest elevation: 47 m (154 ft)
- Lowest elevation: 19 m (62 ft)
- Population (2023): 274
  - Density: 30.1/km^{2} (77.9/sq mi)
- Time zone: UTC+01:00 (CET)
  - Summer (DST): UTC+02:00 (CEST)
- INSEE/Postal code: 17388 /17800
- ^{1} French Land Register data, which excludes lakes, ponds, glaciers > 1 km^{2} (0.386 sq mi or 247 acres) and river estuaries.

Saint-Quantin-de-Rançanne (French pronunciation: [sɛ̃ kɑ̃tɛ̃ də ʁɑ̃san]) is a commune in the Charente-Maritime department in southwestern France.

== Population ==
Historical population
Year	Pop.	±% p.a.
1968	320	—
1975	309	−0.50%
1982	256	−2.65%
1990	282	+1.22%
1999	272	−0.40%
2007	263	−0.42%
2012	287	+1.76%
2017	268	−1.36%
2023	274	+0.37%
Source: INSEE

== See also ==
- Communes of the Charente-Maritime department
