= Avy, Charente-Maritime =

Avy
- Commune
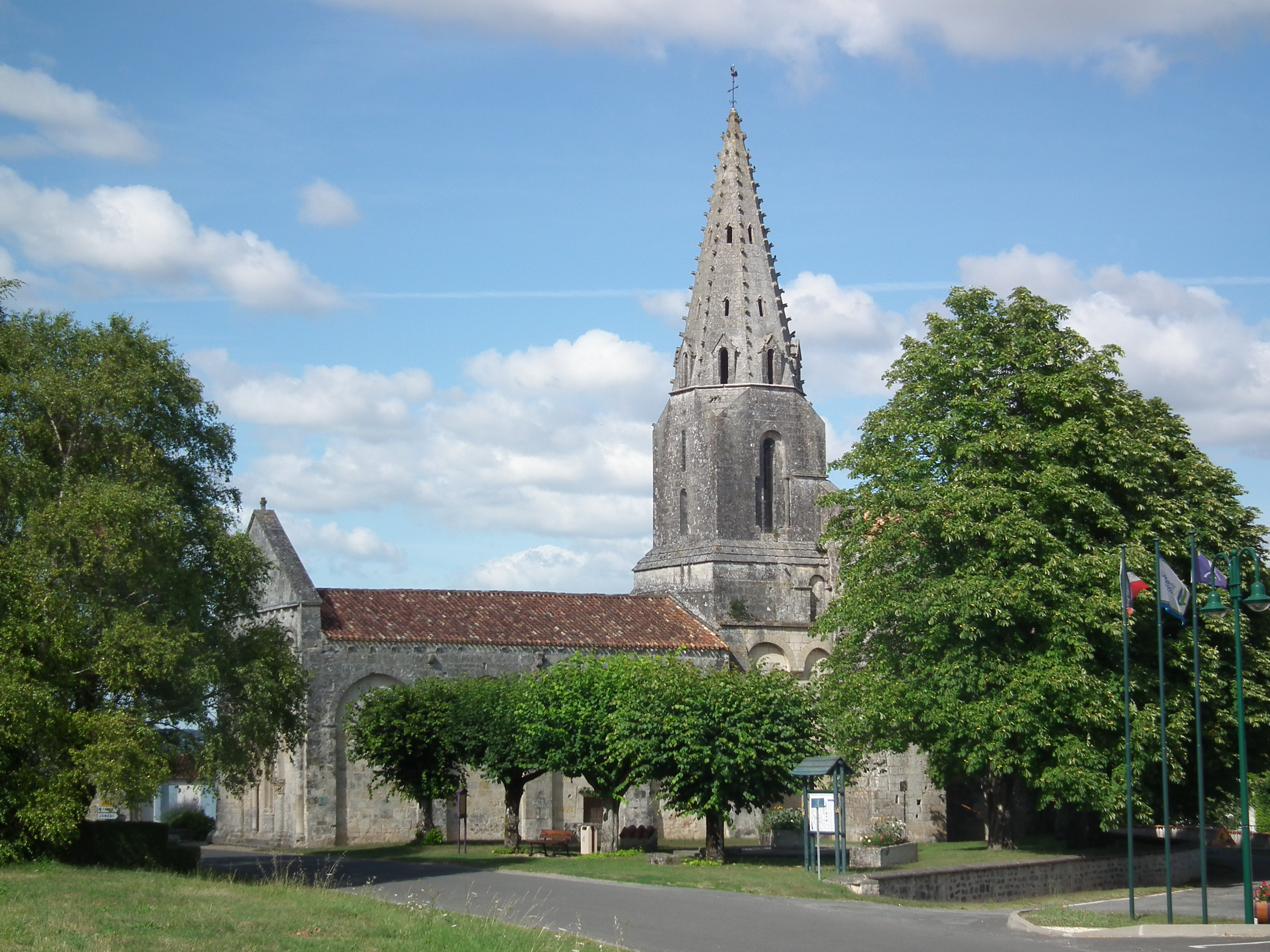
- The church in Avy
- Location of Avy
- Location within France Location within Nouvelle-Aquitaine
- Coordinates: 45°33′12″N 0°30′25″W
- Country: France
- Region: Nouvelle-Aquitaine
- Department: Charente-Maritime
- Arrondissement: Jonzac
- Canton: Pons
- Intercommunality: CC Haute Saintonge

Government
  - Mayor (2020–2026): Joël Troger
- Area^{1}: 14.64 km^{2} (5.65 sq mi)
- Highest elevation: 78 m (256 ft)
- Lowest elevation: 15 m (49 ft)
- Population (2023): 510
  - Density: 35/km^{2} (90/sq mi)
- Time zone: UTC+01:00 (CET)
  - Summer (DST): UTC+02:00 (CEST)
- INSEE/Postal code: 17027 /17800
- ^{1} French Land Register data, which excludes lakes, ponds, glaciers > 1 km^{2} (0.386 sq mi or 247 acres) and river estuaries.

Avy (French pronunciation: [avi]) is a commune in the Charente-Maritime department in southwestern France.

== Population ==
Historical population
Year	Pop.	±% p.a.
1968	361	—
1975	400	+1.48%
1982	399	−0.04%
1990	457	+1.71%
1999	482	+0.59%
2007	472	−0.26%
2012	467	−0.21%
2017	476	+0.38%
2023	510	+1.16%
Source: INSEE

== See also ==
- Communes of the Charente-Maritime department
