= Champagnolles =

- Commune
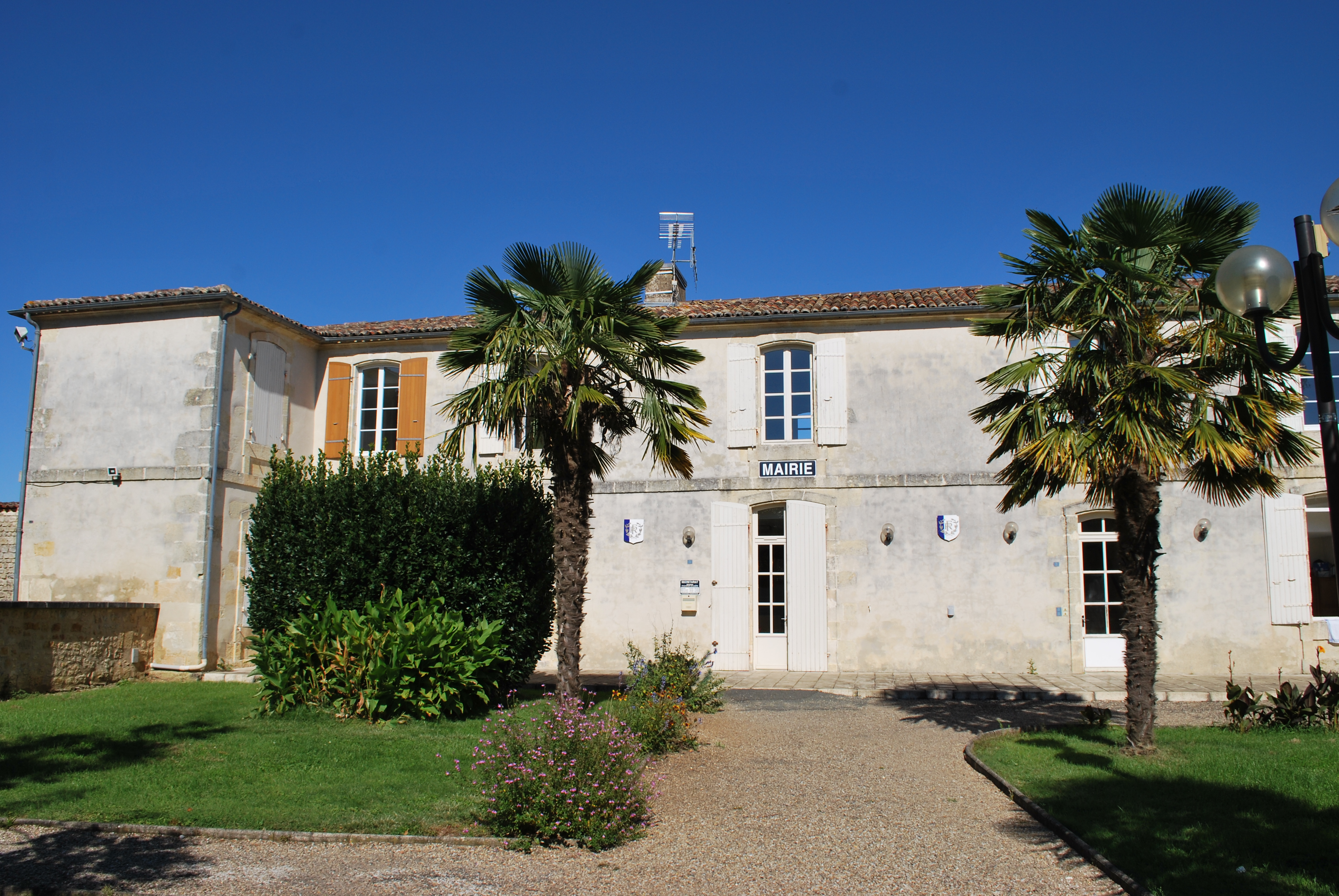
- The town hall in Champagnolles
- Location of Champagnolles
- Location within France Location within Nouvelle-Aquitaine
- Coordinates: 45°30′54″N 0°38′12″W
- Country: France
- Region: Nouvelle-Aquitaine
- Department: Charente-Maritime
- Arrondissement: Jonzac
- Canton: Pons
- Intercommunality: Haute-Saintonge

Government
  - Mayor (2020–2026): Georges Bertrand
- Area^{1}: 17.03 km^{2} (6.58 sq mi)
- Highest elevation: 59 m (194 ft)
- Lowest elevation: 26 m (85 ft)
- Population (2023): 687
  - Density: 40.3/km^{2} (104/sq mi)
- Time zone: UTC+01:00 (CET)
  - Summer (DST): UTC+02:00 (CEST)
- INSEE/Postal code: 17084 /17240
- ^{1} French Land Register data, which excludes lakes, ponds, glaciers > 1 km^{2} (0.386 sq mi or 247 acres) and river estuaries.

Champagnolles (French pronunciation: [ʃɑ̃paɲɔl]) is a commune in the Charente-Maritime department in southwestern France.

== Population ==
Historical population
Year	Pop.	±% p.a.
1968	552	—
1975	527	−0.66%
1982	465	−1.77%
1990	449	−0.44%
1999	500	+1.20%
2007	517	+0.42%
2012	592	+2.75%
2017	648	+1.82%
2023	687	+0.98%
Source: INSEE

== See also ==
- Communes of the Charente-Maritime department
