= Échebrune =

- Commune
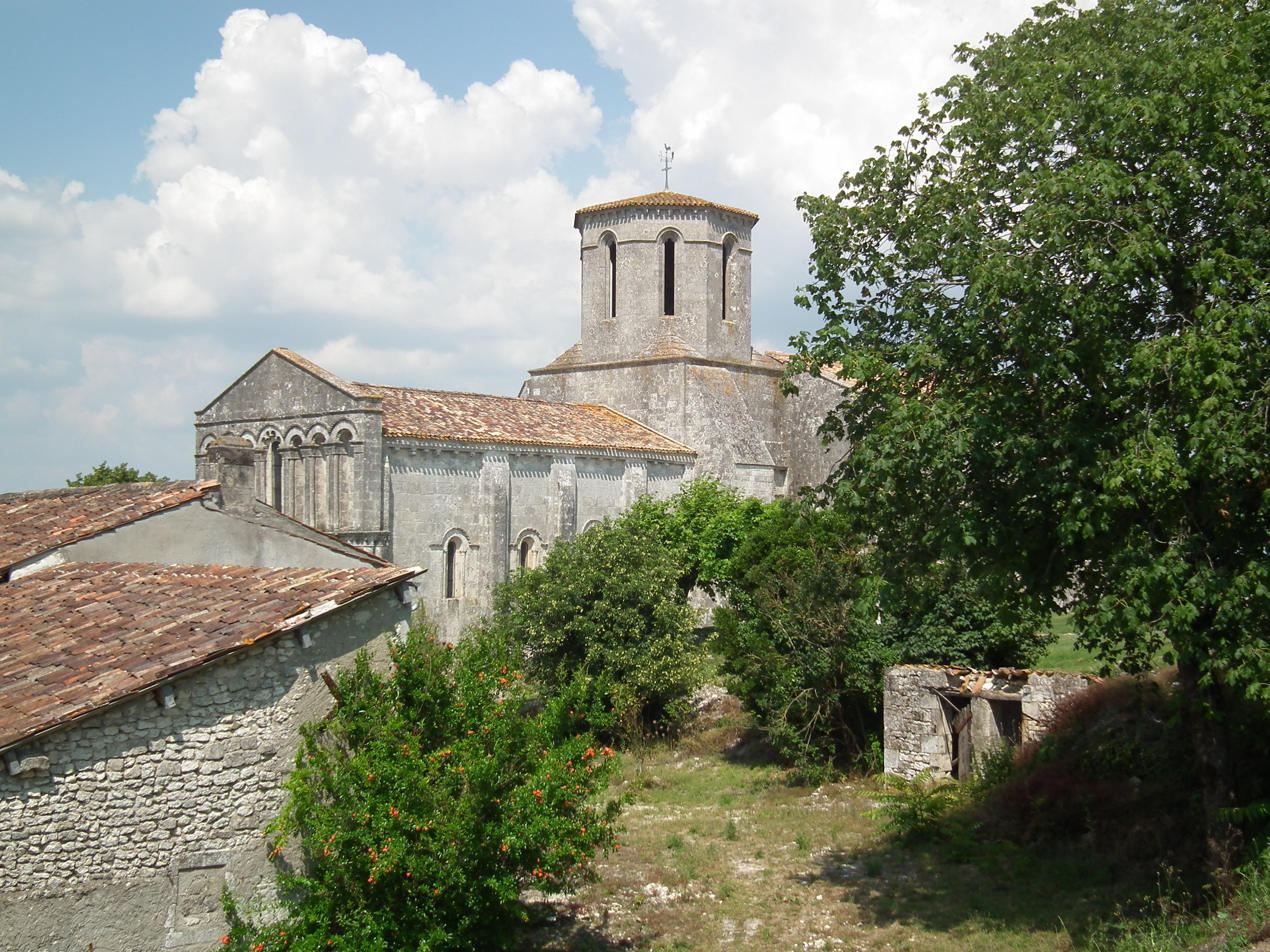
- The church of Saint-Pierre in Échebrune
- Location of Échebrune
- Location within France Location within Nouvelle-Aquitaine
- Coordinates: 45°35′41″N 0°27′51″W
- Country: France
- Region: Nouvelle-Aquitaine
- Department: Charente-Maritime
- Arrondissement: Jonzac
- Canton: Pons
- Intercommunality: Haute-Saintonge

Government
  - Mayor (2020–2026): Christian Lavalette
- Area^{1}: 17.08 km^{2} (6.59 sq mi)
- Highest elevation: 107 m (351 ft)
- Lowest elevation: 29 m (95 ft)
- Population (2023): 480
  - Density: 28/km^{2} (73/sq mi)
- Time zone: UTC+01:00 (CET)
  - Summer (DST): UTC+02:00 (CEST)
- INSEE/Postal code: 17145 /17800
- ^{1} French Land Register data, which excludes lakes, ponds, glaciers > 1 km^{2} (0.386 sq mi or 247 acres) and river estuaries.

Échebrune (French pronunciation: [eʃ(ə)bʁyn]) is a commune in the Charente-Maritime department in southwestern France.

== Population ==
Historical population
Year	Pop.	±% p.a.
1968	505	—
1975	507	+0.06%
1982	476	−0.90%
1990	440	−0.98%
1999	451	+0.27%
2007	497	+1.22%
2012	490	−0.28%
2017	485	−0.20%
2023	480	−0.17%
Source: INSEE

== See also ==
- Communes of the Charente-Maritime department
