= Biron, Charente-Maritime =

Biron
- Commune
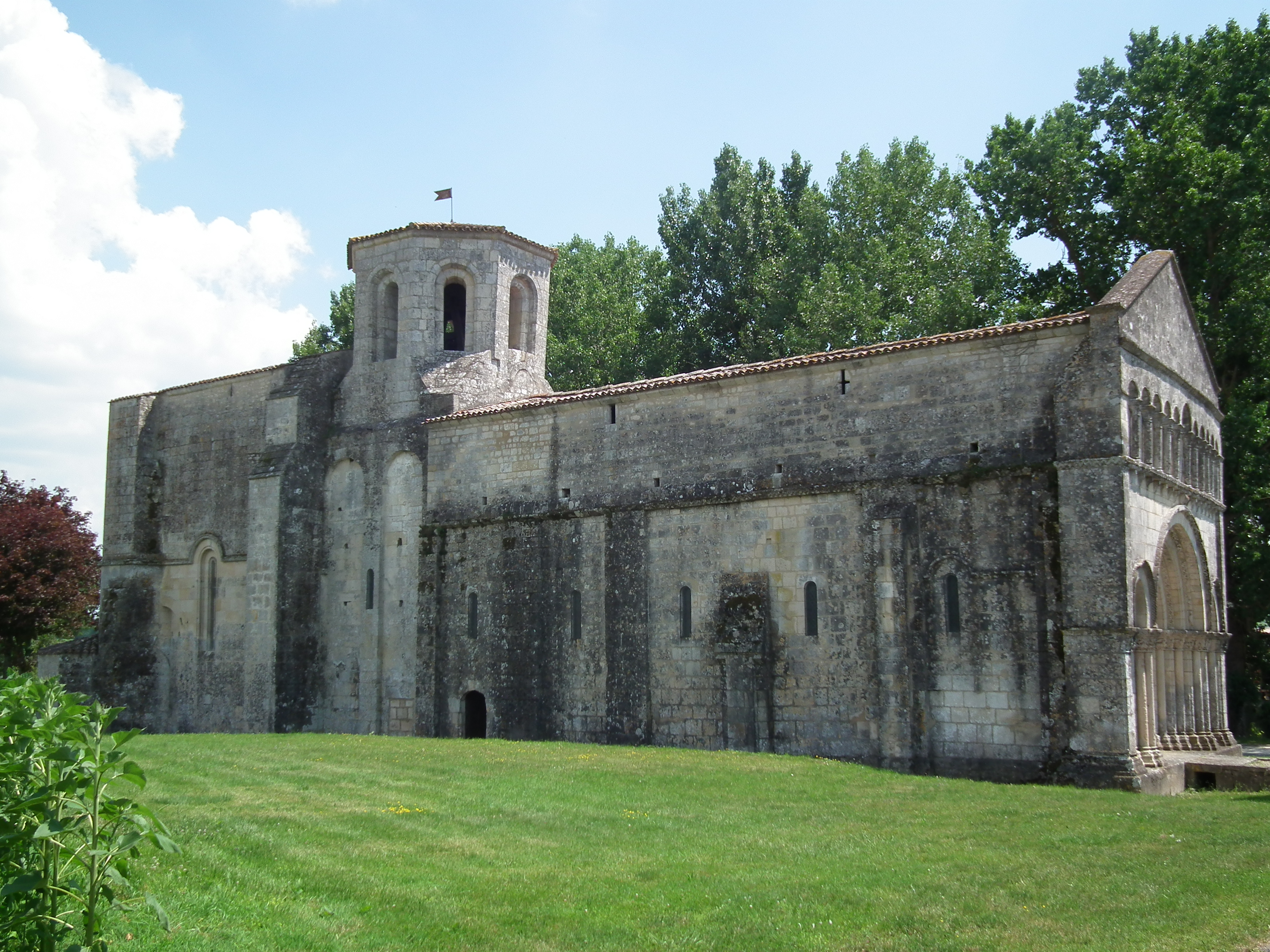
- The church in Biron
- Location of Biron
- Location within France Location within Nouvelle-Aquitaine
- Coordinates: 45°34′14″N 0°28′39″W
- Country: France
- Region: Nouvelle-Aquitaine
- Department: Charente-Maritime
- Arrondissement: Jonzac
- Canton: Pons

Government
  - Mayor (2020–2026): Cathia Seguin-Gallot
- Area^{1}: 8.71 km^{2} (3.36 sq mi)
- Highest elevation: 81 m (266 ft)
- Lowest elevation: 15 m (49 ft)
- Population (2023): 243
  - Density: 27.9/km^{2} (72.3/sq mi)
- Time zone: UTC+01:00 (CET)
  - Summer (DST): UTC+02:00 (CEST)
- INSEE/Postal code: 17047 /17800
- ^{1} French Land Register data, which excludes lakes, ponds, glaciers > 1 km^{2} (0.386 sq mi or 247 acres) and river estuaries.

Biron (French pronunciation: [biʁɔ̃]) is a commune in the Charente-Maritime department in southwestern France. In the late nineteenth century Philippe Delamain, a merchant from Jarnac, excavated a cemetery from the Merovingian period in Biron, part of which is now in the British Museum in London.

== Population ==
Historical population
Year	Pop.	±% p.a.
1968	219	—
1975	208	−0.73%
1982	190	−1.28%
1990	249	+3.44%
1999	233	−0.74%
2007	234	+0.05%
2012	227	−0.61%
2017	230	+0.26%
2023	243	+0.92%
Source: INSEE

== See also ==
- Communes of the Charente-Maritime department
