= Saint-Palais-de-Phiolin =

- Commune
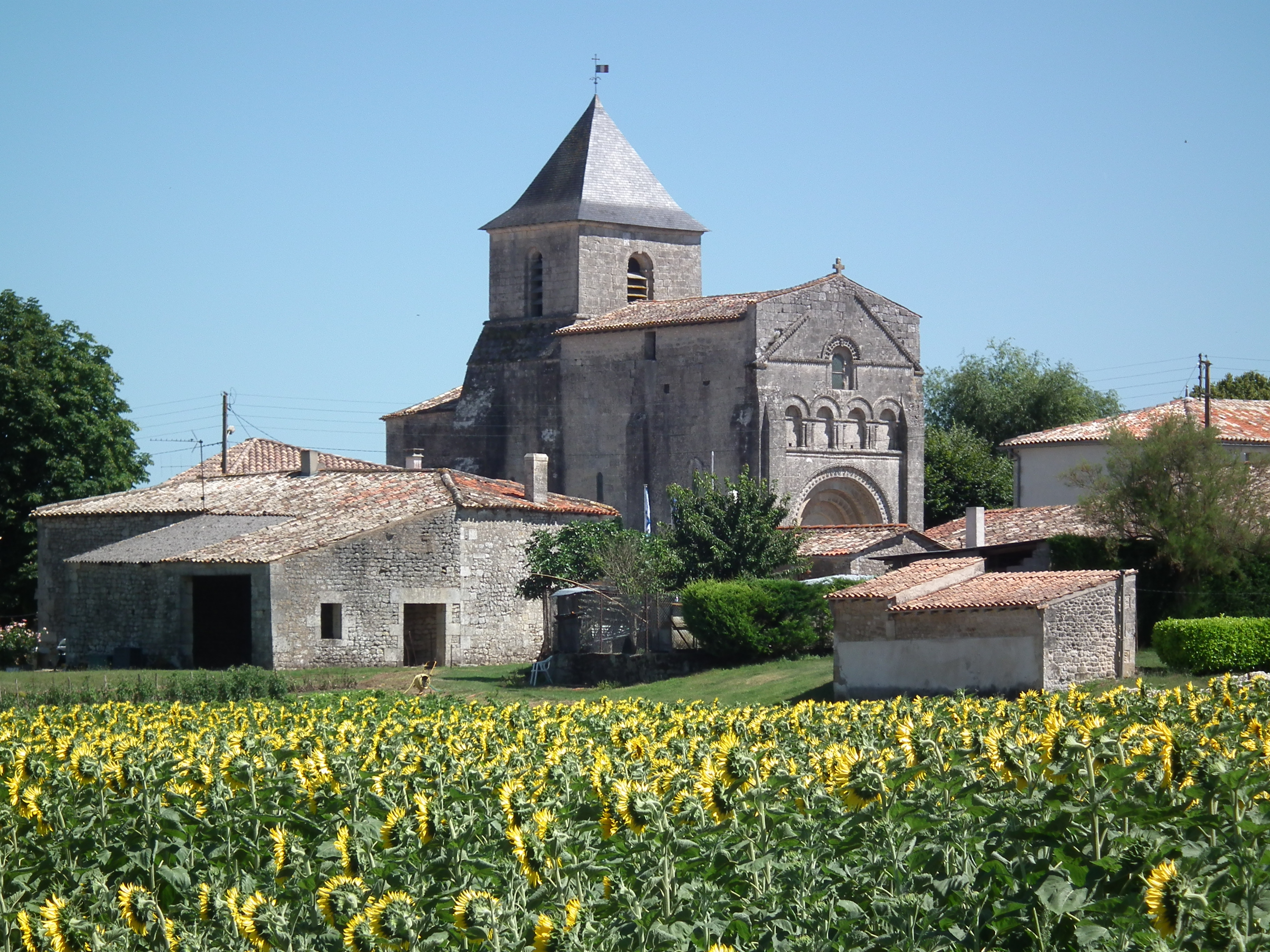
- The church and surroundings in Saint-Palais-de-Phiolin
- Location of Saint-Palais-de-Phiolin
- Location within France Location within Nouvelle-Aquitaine
- Coordinates: 45°31′03″N 0°35′53″W
- Country: France
- Region: Nouvelle-Aquitaine
- Department: Charente-Maritime
- Arrondissement: Jonzac
- Canton: Pons
- Intercommunality: Haute-Saintonge

Government
  - Mayor (2020–2026): Guy Fouche
- Area^{1}: 11.01 km^{2} (4.25 sq mi)
- Elevation: 30 m (98 ft)
- Highest elevation: 49 m (161 ft)
- Lowest elevation: 19 m (62 ft)
- Population (2023): 214
  - Density: 19.4/km^{2} (50.3/sq mi)
- Time zone: UTC+01:00 (CET)
  - Summer (DST): UTC+02:00 (CEST)
- INSEE/Postal code: 17379 /17800
- ^{1} French Land Register data, which excludes lakes, ponds, glaciers > 1 km^{2} (0.386 sq mi or 247 acres) and river estuaries.

Saint-Palais-de-Phiolin (French pronunciation: [sɛ̃ palɛ də fjɔlɛ̃]) is a commune in the Charente-Maritime department in southwestern France.

== Population ==
Historical population
Year	Pop.	±% p.a.
1968	264	—
1975	261	−0.16%
1982	235	−1.49%
1990	219	−0.88%
1999	218	−0.05%
2007	247	+1.57%
2012	212	−3.01%
2017	208	−0.38%
2023	214	+0.48%
Source: INSEE

== See also ==
- Communes of the Charente-Maritime department
