= Lorignac =

- Commune
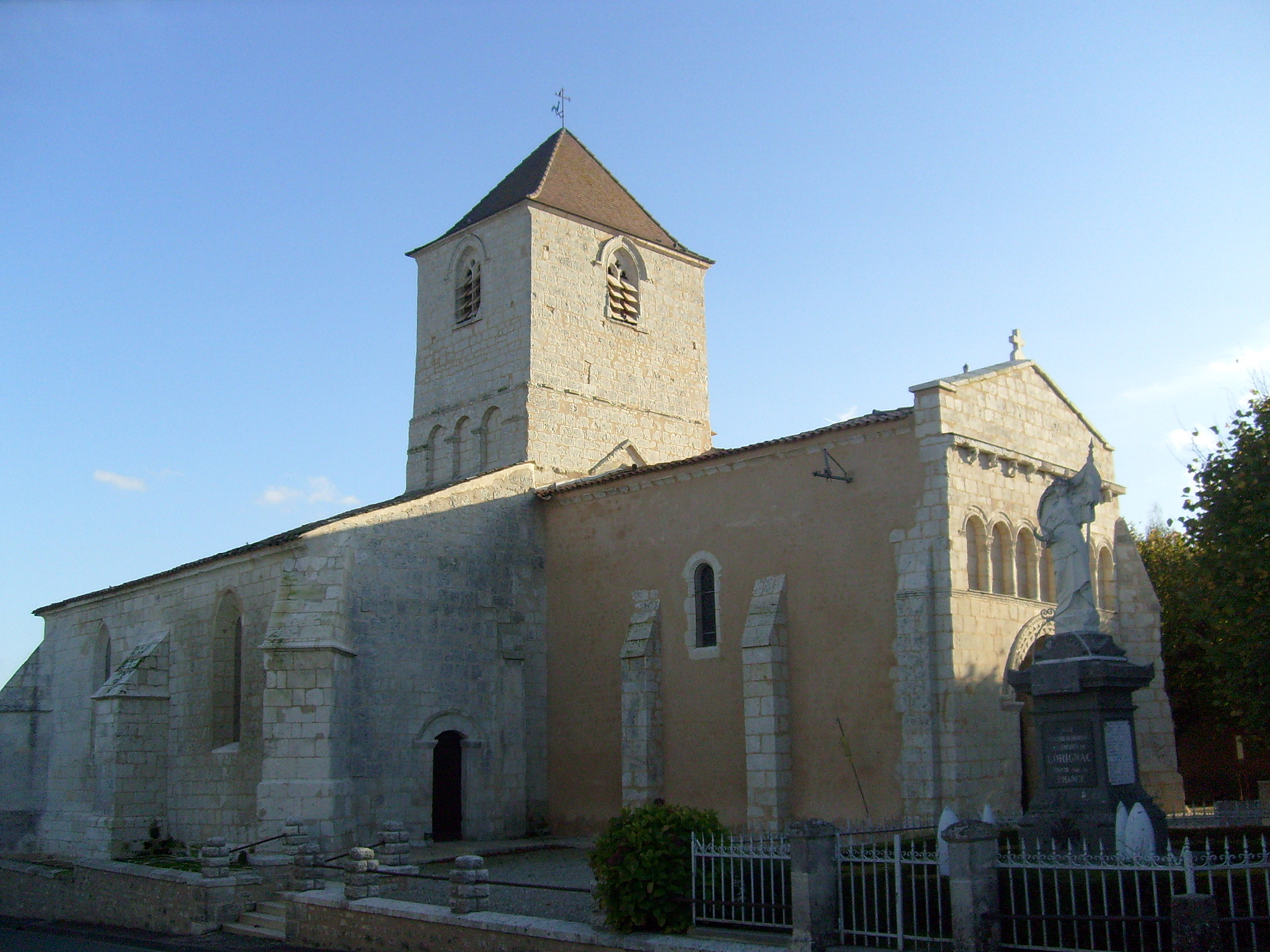
- Romanesque church
- Location of Lorignac
- Location within France Location within Nouvelle-Aquitaine
- Coordinates: 45°27′21″N 0°41′23″W
- Country: France
- Region: Nouvelle-Aquitaine
- Department: Charente-Maritime
- Arrondissement: Jonzac
- Canton: Pons
- Intercommunality: Haute-Saintonge

Government
  - Mayor (2020–2026): Christian Rouger
- Area^{1}: 17.53 km^{2} (6.77 sq mi)
- Highest elevation: 61 m (200 ft)
- Lowest elevation: 7 m (23 ft)
- Population (2023): 499
  - Density: 28.5/km^{2} (73.7/sq mi)
- Time zone: UTC+01:00 (CET)
  - Summer (DST): UTC+02:00 (CEST)
- INSEE/Postal code: 17210 /17240
- ^{1} French Land Register data, which excludes lakes, ponds, glaciers > 1 km^{2} (0.386 sq mi or 247 acres) and river estuaries.

Lorignac (French pronunciation: [lɔʁiɲak]) is a commune in the Charente-Maritime department in southwestern France.

== Population ==
Historical population
Year	Pop.	±% p.a.
1968	718	—
1975	640	−1.63%
1982	584	−1.30%
1990	534	−1.11%
1999	447	−1.96%
2007	456	+0.25%
2012	481	+1.07%
2017	493	+0.49%
2023	499	+0.20%
Source: INSEE

== See also ==
- Communes of the Charente-Maritime department
