= Saint-Bonnet-sur-Gironde =

- Commune
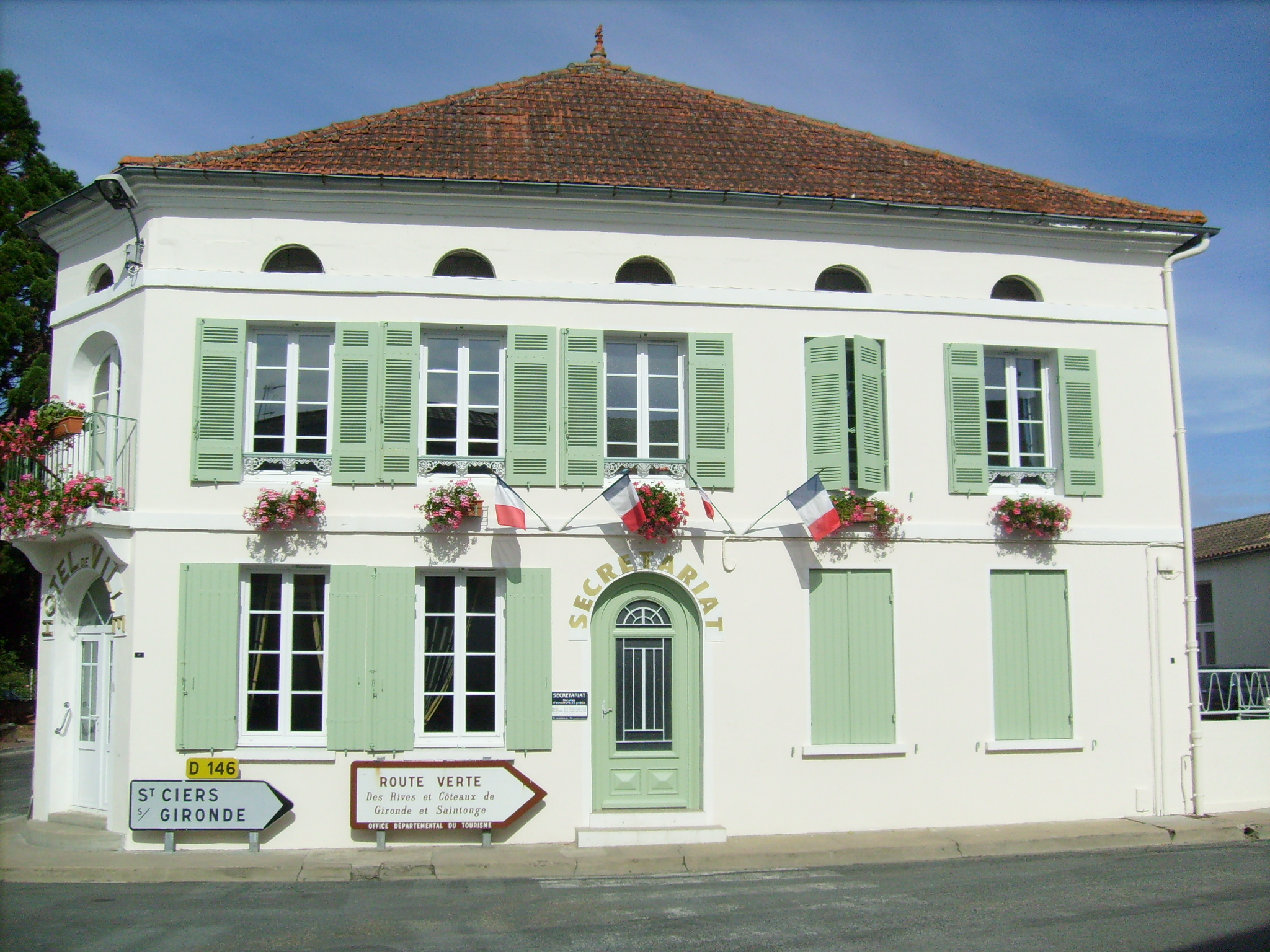
- The town hall in Saint-Bonnet-sur-Gironde
- Location of Saint-Bonnet-sur-Gironde
- Location within France Location within Nouvelle-Aquitaine
- Coordinates: 45°21′19″N 0°39′32″W
- Country: France
- Region: Nouvelle-Aquitaine
- Department: Charente-Maritime
- Arrondissement: Jonzac
- Canton: Pons
- Intercommunality: Haute-Saintonge

Government
  - Mayor (2020–2026): Laurent Nivard
- Area^{1}: 30.60 km^{2} (11.81 sq mi)
- Elevation: 9 m (30 ft)
- Highest elevation: 87 m (285 ft)
- Lowest elevation: 0 m (0 ft)
- Population (2023): 859
  - Density: 28.1/km^{2} (72.7/sq mi)
- Time zone: UTC+01:00 (CET)
  - Summer (DST): UTC+02:00 (CEST)
- INSEE/Postal code: 17312 /17150
- ^{1} French Land Register data, which excludes lakes, ponds, glaciers > 1 km^{2} (0.386 sq mi or 247 acres) and river estuaries.

Saint-Bonnet-sur-Gironde (French pronunciation: [sɛ̃ bɔnɛ syʁ ʒiʁɔ̃d]) is a commune in the Charente-Maritime department in the Nouvelle-Aquitaine region in southwestern France. It is situated on the right (east) bank of the river Gironde.

== Population ==
Historical population
Year	Pop.	±% p.a.
1968	1,003	—
1975	901	−1.52%
1982	899	−0.03%
1990	819	−1.16%
1999	838	+0.26%
2007	856	+0.27%
2012	848	−0.19%
2017	825	−0.55%
2023	859	+0.68%
Source: INSEE

== See also ==
- Communes of the Charente-Maritime department
