= Semillac =

- Commune
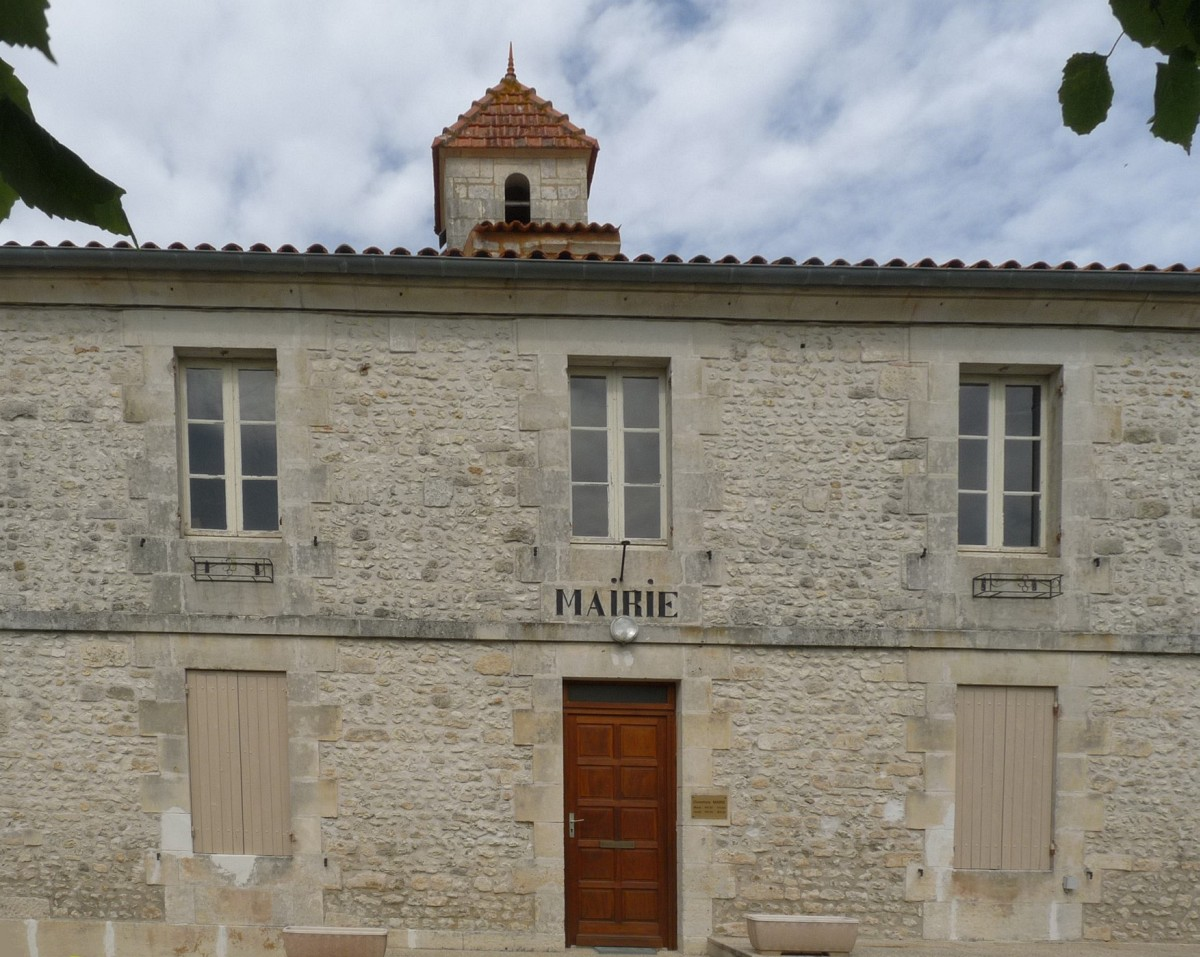
- The town hall in Semillac
- Location of Semillac
- Location within France Location within Nouvelle-Aquitaine
- Coordinates: 45°23′48″N 0°35′39″W
- Country: France
- Region: Nouvelle-Aquitaine
- Department: Charente-Maritime
- Arrondissement: Jonzac
- Canton: Pons

Government
  - Mayor (2020–2026): Charles Pain
- Area^{1}: 2.47 km^{2} (0.95 sq mi)
- Highest elevation: 89 m (292 ft)
- Lowest elevation: 48 m (157 ft)
- Population (2023): 65
  - Density: 26/km^{2} (68/sq mi)
- Time zone: UTC+01:00 (CET)
  - Summer (DST): UTC+02:00 (CEST)
- INSEE/Postal code: 17423 /17150
- ^{1} French Land Register data, which excludes lakes, ponds, glaciers > 1 km^{2} (0.386 sq mi or 247 acres) and river estuaries.

Semillac (French pronunciation: [səmijak]) is a commune in the Charente-Maritime department in the Nouvelle-Aquitaine region in southwestern France.

== Population ==
Historical population
Year	Pop.	±% p.a.
1968	54	—
1975	45	−2.57%
1982	63	+4.92%
1990	53	−2.14%
1999	52	−0.21%
2007	63	+2.43%
2012	68	+1.54%
2017	72	+1.15%
2023	65	−1.69%
Source: INSEE

== See also ==
- Communes of the Charente-Maritime department
