= Saint-Georges-des-Agoûts =

- Commune
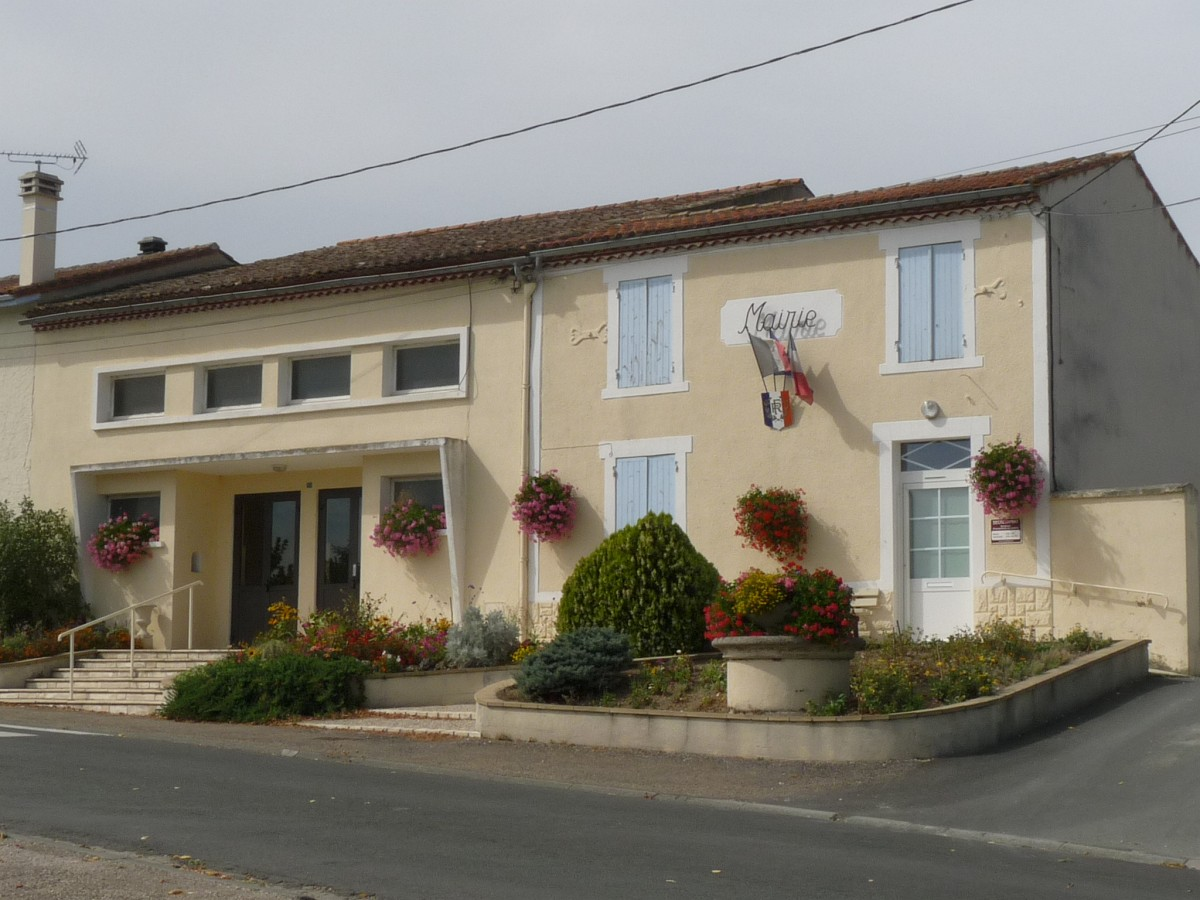
- The town hall in Saint-Georges-des-Agoûts

- Coat of arms
- Location of Saint-Georges-des-Agoûts
- Location within France Location within Nouvelle-Aquitaine
- Coordinates: 45°22′34″N 0°38′42″W
- Country: France
- Region: Nouvelle-Aquitaine
- Department: Charente-Maritime
- Arrondissement: Jonzac
- Canton: Pons

Government
  - Mayor (2020–2026): Didier Bernard
- Area^{1}: 6.31 km^{2} (2.44 sq mi)
- Highest elevation: 90 m (300 ft)
- Lowest elevation: 0 m (0 ft)
- Population (2023): 278
  - Density: 44.1/km^{2} (114/sq mi)
- Time zone: UTC+01:00 (CET)
  - Summer (DST): UTC+02:00 (CEST)
- INSEE/Postal code: 17335 /17150
- ^{1} French Land Register data, which excludes lakes, ponds, glaciers > 1 km^{2} (0.386 sq mi or 247 acres) and river estuaries.

Saint-Georges-des-Agoûts (French pronunciation: [sɛ̃ ʒɔʁʒ de.z‿aɡu]) is a commune in the Charente-Maritime department in the Nouvelle-Aquitaine region in southwestern France.

== Population ==
Historical population
Year	Pop.	±% p.a.
1968	302	—
1975	253	−2.50%
1982	260	+0.39%
1990	243	−0.84%
1999	245	+0.09%
2007	260	+0.75%
2012	259	−0.08%
2017	288	+2.15%
2023	278	−0.59%
Source: INSEE

== See also ==
- Communes of the Charente-Maritime department
