= Saint-Martial-de-Mirambeau =

- Commune
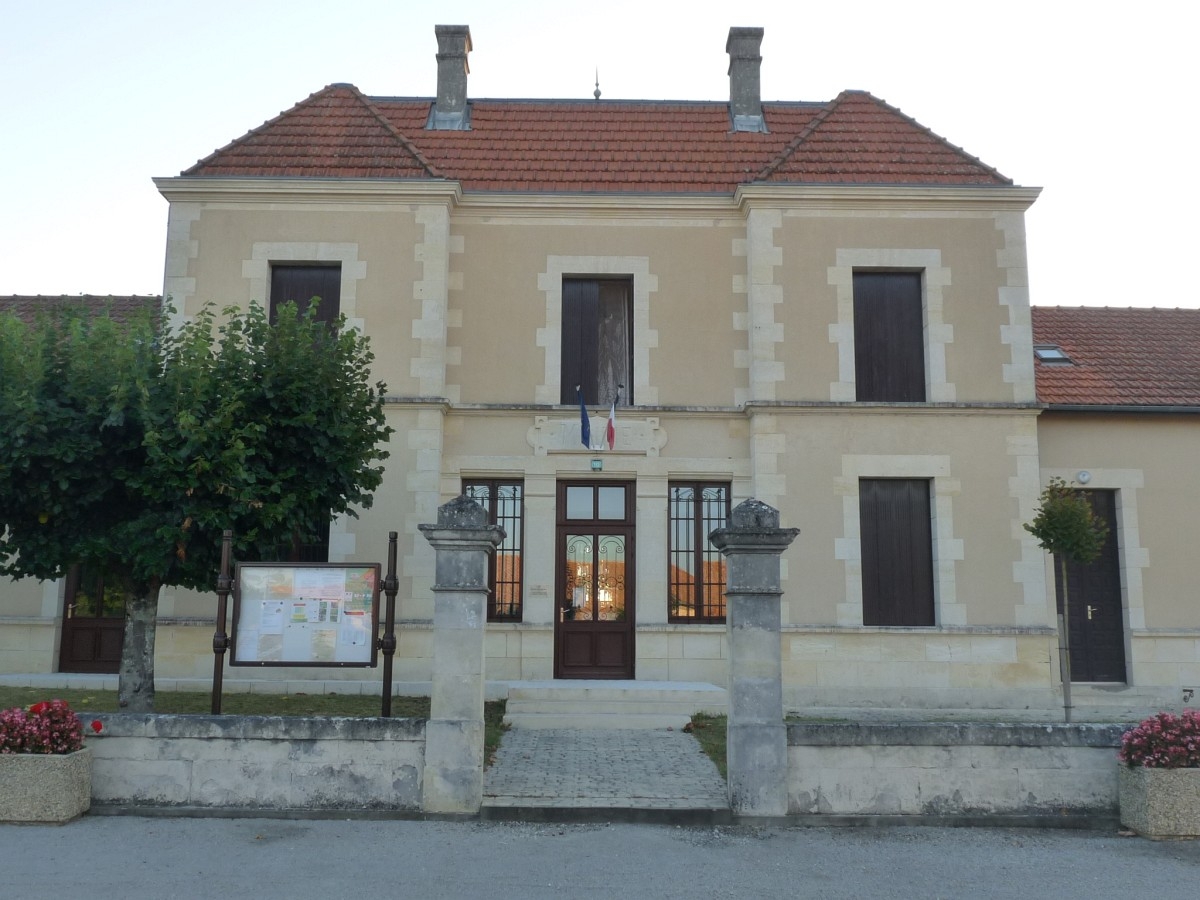
- The town hall in Saint-Martial-de-Mirambeau
- Location of Saint-Martial-de-Mirambeau
- Location within France Location within Nouvelle-Aquitaine
- Coordinates: 45°22′56″N 0°35′31″W
- Country: France
- Region: Nouvelle-Aquitaine
- Department: Charente-Maritime
- Arrondissement: Jonzac
- Canton: Pons

Government
  - Mayor (2020–2026): Bruno Robert
- Area^{1}: 9.08 km^{2} (3.51 sq mi)
- Highest elevation: 94 m (308 ft)
- Lowest elevation: 8 m (26 ft)
- Population (2023): 302
  - Density: 33.3/km^{2} (86.1/sq mi)
- Time zone: UTC+01:00 (CET)
  - Summer (DST): UTC+02:00 (CEST)
- INSEE/Postal code: 17362 /17150
- ^{1} French Land Register data, which excludes lakes, ponds, glaciers > 1 km^{2} (0.386 sq mi or 247 acres) and river estuaries.

Saint-Martial-de-Mirambeau (French pronunciation: [sɛ̃ maʁsjal də miʁɑ̃bo], literally Saint-Martial of Mirambeau) is a commune in the Charente-Maritime department in the Nouvelle-Aquitaine region in southwestern France.

== Population ==
Historical population
Year	Pop.	±% p.a.
1968	244	—
1975	202	−2.66%
1982	183	−1.40%
1990	194	+0.73%
1999	220	+1.41%
2007	237	+0.93%
2012	235	−0.17%
2017	270	+2.82%
2023	302	+1.88%
Source: INSEE

== See also ==
- Communes of the Charente-Maritime department
