= Semoussac =

- Commune
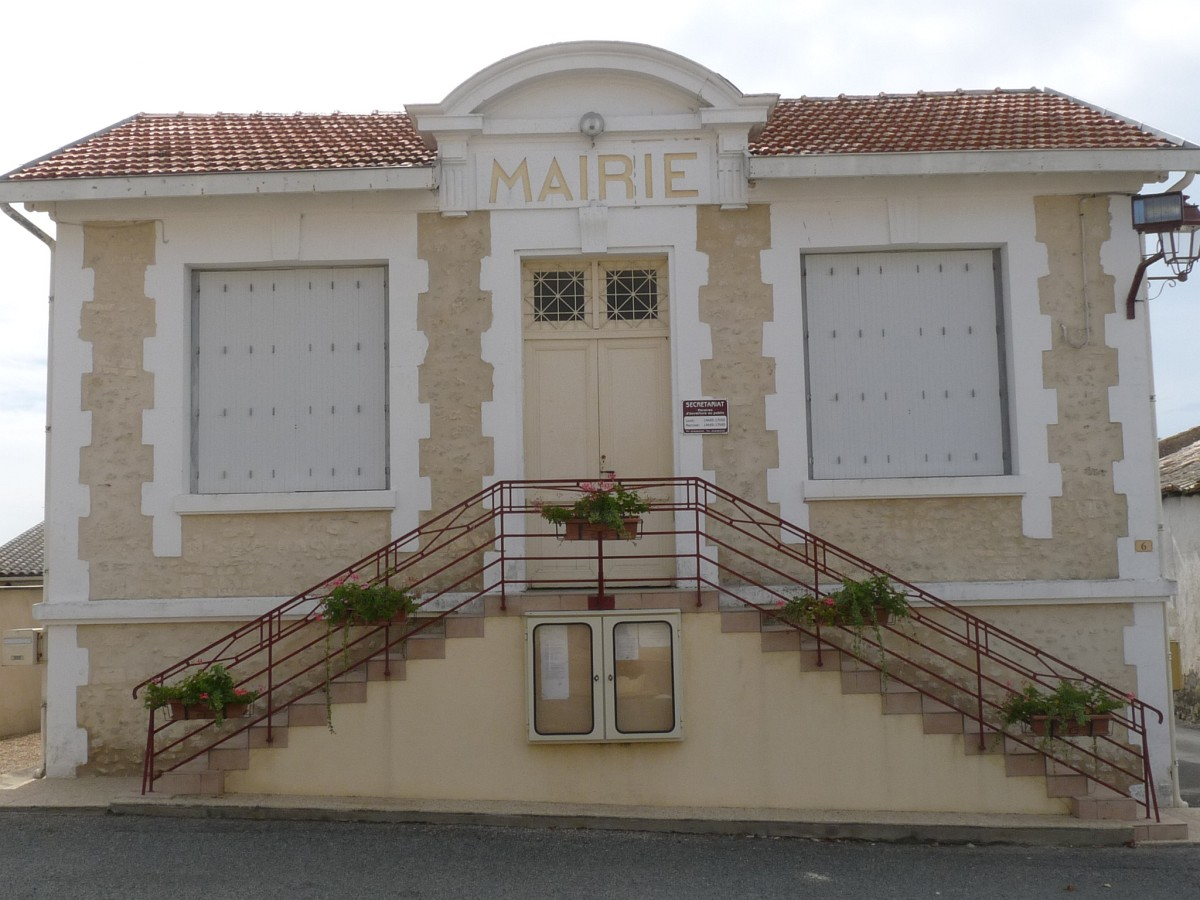
- The town hall in Semoussac
- Location of Semoussac
- Location within France Location within Nouvelle-Aquitaine
- Coordinates: 45°23′13″N 0°37′13″W
- Country: France
- Region: Nouvelle-Aquitaine
- Department: Charente-Maritime
- Arrondissement: Jonzac
- Canton: Pons

Government
  - Mayor (2020–2026): Marc Bertrand
- Area^{1}: 9.62 km^{2} (3.71 sq mi)
- Highest elevation: 103 m (338 ft)
- Lowest elevation: 8 m (26 ft)
- Population (2023): 386
  - Density: 40.1/km^{2} (104/sq mi)
- Time zone: UTC+01:00 (CET)
  - Summer (DST): UTC+02:00 (CEST)
- INSEE/Postal code: 17424 /17150
- ^{1} French Land Register data, which excludes lakes, ponds, glaciers > 1 km^{2} (0.386 sq mi or 247 acres) and river estuaries.

Semoussac (French pronunciation: [səmusak]) is a commune in the Charente-Maritime department in the Nouvelle-Aquitaine region in southwestern France.

== Population ==
Historical population
Year	Pop.	±% p.a.
1968	277	—
1975	251	−1.40%
1982	243	−0.46%
1990	212	−1.69%
1999	220	+0.41%
2007	266	+2.40%
2012	295	+2.09%
2017	364	+4.29%
2023	386	+0.98%
Source: INSEE

== See also ==
- Communes of the Charente-Maritime department
