= Boisredon =

- Commune
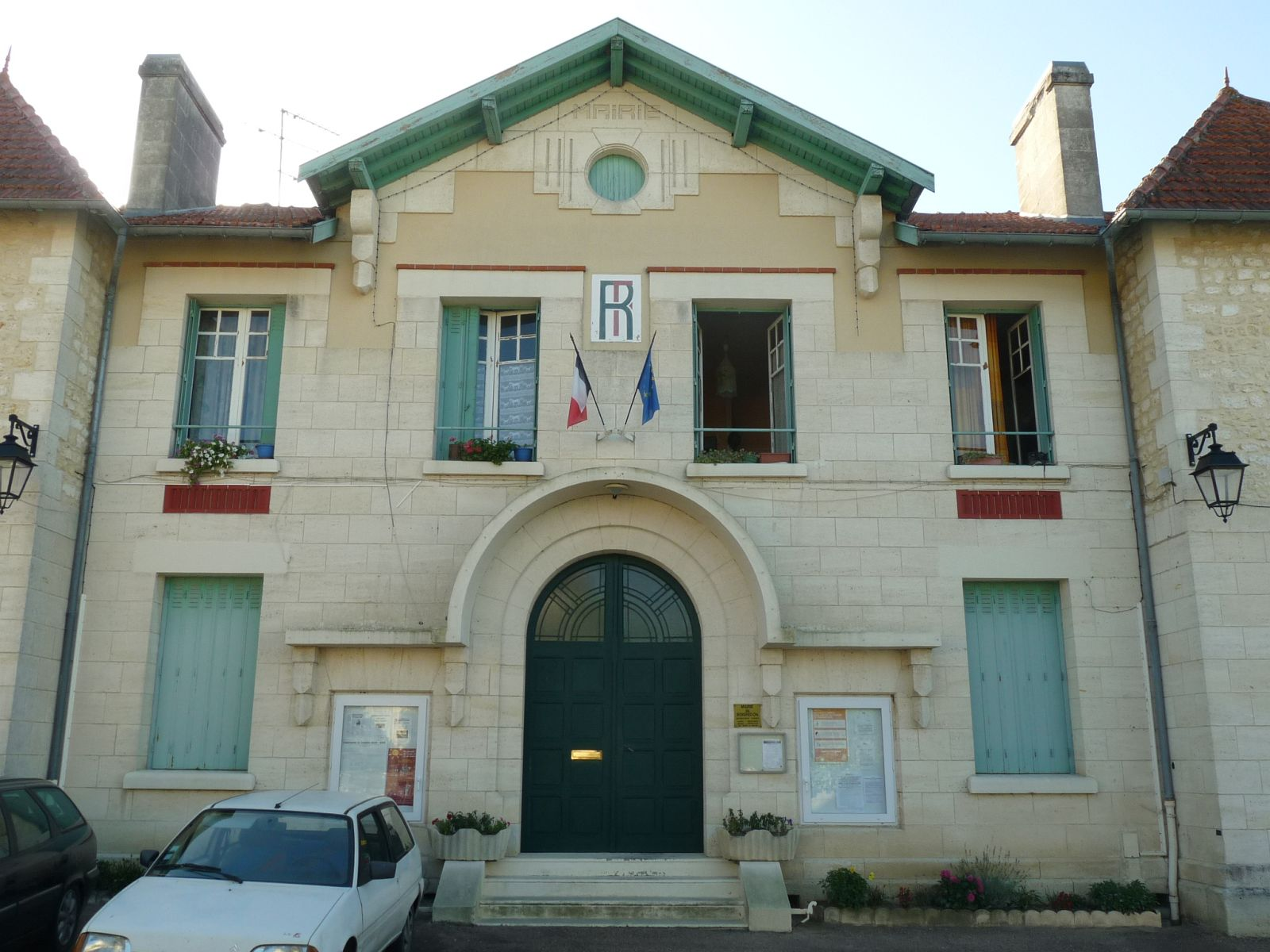
- Town hall

- Coat of arms
- Location of Boisredon
- Location within France Location within Nouvelle-Aquitaine
- Coordinates: 45°18′54″N 0°32′16″W
- Country: France
- Region: Nouvelle-Aquitaine
- Department: Charente-Maritime
- Arrondissement: Jonzac
- Canton: Pons

Government
  - Mayor (2020–2026): Michel Audebert
- Area^{1}: 21.6 km^{2} (8.3 sq mi)
- Elevation: 33 m (108 ft)
- Highest elevation: 108 m (354 ft)
- Lowest elevation: 19 m (62 ft)
- Population (2023): 711
  - Density: 32.9/km^{2} (85.3/sq mi)
- Time zone: UTC+01:00 (CET)
  - Summer (DST): UTC+02:00 (CEST)
- INSEE/Postal code: 17052 /17150
- ^{1} French Land Register data, which excludes lakes, ponds, glaciers > 1 km^{2} (0.386 sq mi or 247 acres) and river estuaries.

Boisredon (French pronunciation: [bwaʁədɔ̃]) is a commune in the Charente-Maritime department in the Nouvelle-Aquitaine region in southwestern France.

== Population ==
Historical population
Year	Pop.	±% p.a.
1968	685	—
1975	644	−0.88%
1982	656	+0.26%
1990	603	−1.05%
1999	600	−0.06%
2007	630	+0.61%
2012	713	+2.51%
2017	702	−0.31%
2023	711	+0.21%
Source: INSEE

== See also ==
- Communes of the Charente-Maritime department
