= Saint-Sorlin-de-Conac =

- Commune
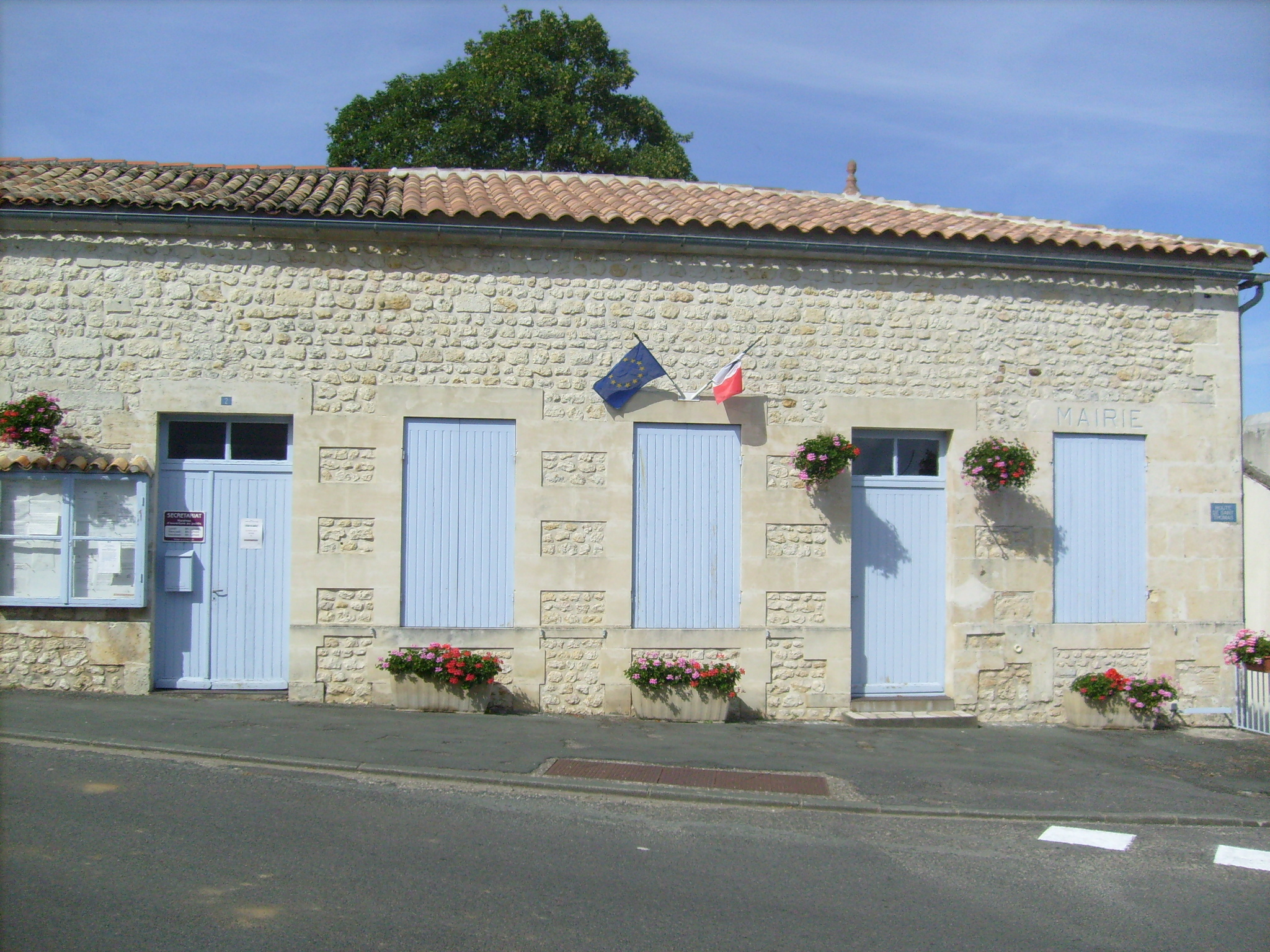
- The town hall in Saint-Sorlin-de-Conac
- Location of Saint-Sorlin-de-Conac
- Location within France Location within Nouvelle-Aquitaine
- Coordinates: 45°22′09″N 0°40′40″W
- Country: France
- Region: Nouvelle-Aquitaine
- Department: Charente-Maritime
- Arrondissement: Jonzac
- Canton: Pons

Government
  - Mayor (2020–2026): Cyril Penaud
- Area^{1}: 15.37 km^{2} (5.93 sq mi)
- Highest elevation: 71 m (233 ft)
- Lowest elevation: 0 m (0 ft)
- Population (2023): 209
  - Density: 13.6/km^{2} (35.2/sq mi)
- Time zone: UTC+01:00 (CET)
  - Summer (DST): UTC+02:00 (CEST)
- INSEE/Postal code: 17405 /17150
- ^{1} French Land Register data, which excludes lakes, ponds, glaciers > 1 km^{2} (0.386 sq mi or 247 acres) and river estuaries.

Saint-Sorlin-de-Conac (French pronunciation: [sɛ̃ sɔʁlɛ̃ də kɔnak]) is a commune in the Charente-Maritime department in the Nouvelle-Aquitaine region of southwestern France.

== Population ==
Historical population
Year	Pop.	±% p.a.
1968	305	—
1975	231	−3.89%
1982	224	−0.44%
1990	212	−0.69%
1999	201	−0.59%
2007	199	−0.12%
2012	205	+0.60%
2017	198	−0.69%
2023	209	+0.91%
Source: INSEE

== See also ==
- Communes of the Charente-Maritime department
