= Soubran =

- Commune
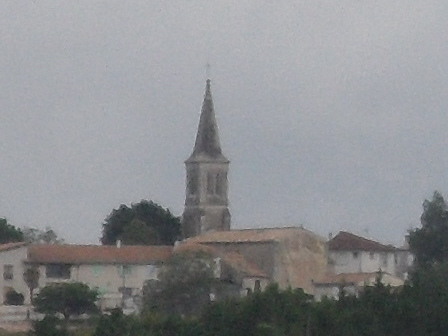
- The church in Soubran
- Location of Soubran
- Location within France Location within Nouvelle-Aquitaine
- Coordinates: 45°21′16″N 0°30′47″W
- Country: France
- Region: Nouvelle-Aquitaine
- Department: Charente-Maritime
- Arrondissement: Jonzac
- Canton: Pons

Government
  - Mayor (2020–2026): Maud Maingot
- Area^{1}: 13.25 km^{2} (5.12 sq mi)
- Highest elevation: 208 m (682 ft)
- Lowest elevation: 38 m (125 ft)
- Population (2023): 414
  - Density: 31.2/km^{2} (80.9/sq mi)
- Time zone: UTC+01:00 (CET)
  - Summer (DST): UTC+02:00 (CEST)
- INSEE/Postal code: 17430 /17150
- ^{1} French Land Register data, which excludes lakes, ponds, glaciers > 1 km^{2} (0.386 sq mi or 247 acres) and river estuaries.

Soubran (French pronunciation: [subʁɑ̃]) is a commune in the Charente-Maritime department in the Nouvelle-Aquitaine region in southwestern France.

== Population ==
Historical population
Year	Pop.	±% p.a.
1968	364	—
1975	316	−2.00%
1982	330	+0.62%
1990	328	−0.08%
1999	360	+1.04%
2007	377	+0.58%
2012	396	+0.99%
2017	380	−0.82%
2023	414	+1.44%
Source: INSEE

== See also ==
- Communes of the Charente-Maritime department
