= Saint-Thomas-de-Conac =

- Commune
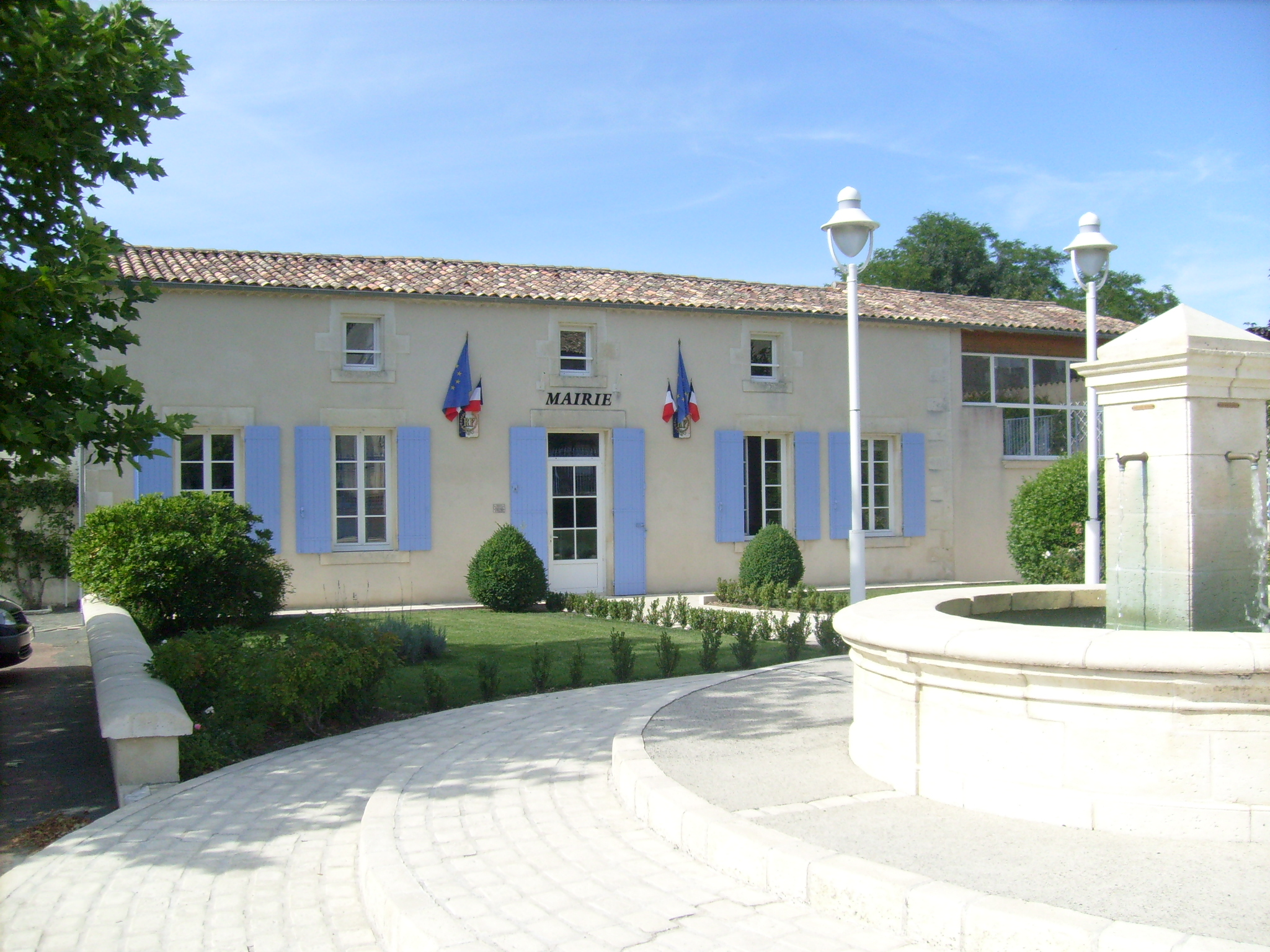
- The town hall in Saint-Thomas-de-Conac
- Location of Saint-Thomas-de-Conac
- Location within France Location within Nouvelle-Aquitaine
- Coordinates: 45°23′23″N 0°41′10″W
- Country: France
- Region: Nouvelle-Aquitaine
- Department: Charente-Maritime
- Arrondissement: Jonzac
- Canton: Pons

Government
  - Mayor (2023–2026): Hugues Sciard
- Area^{1}: 28.04 km^{2} (10.83 sq mi)
- Highest elevation: 101 m (331 ft)
- Lowest elevation: 0 m (0 ft)
- Population (2023): 590
  - Density: 21/km^{2} (54/sq mi)
- Time zone: UTC+01:00 (CET)
  - Summer (DST): UTC+02:00 (CEST)
- INSEE/Postal code: 17410 /17150
- ^{1} French Land Register data, which excludes lakes, ponds, glaciers > 1 km^{2} (0.386 sq mi or 247 acres) and river estuaries.

Saint-Thomas-de-Conac (French pronunciation: [sɛ̃ tɔmɑ d(ə) kɔnak]) is a commune in the Charente-Maritime department in the Nouvelle-Aquitaine region in southwestern France.

== Population ==
Historical population
Year	Pop.	±% p.a.
1968	778	—
1975	723	−1.04%
1982	657	−1.36%
1990	610	−0.92%
1999	545	−1.24%
2007	555	+0.23%
2012	560	+0.18%
2017	559	−0.04%
2023	590	+0.90%
Source: INSEE

== See also ==
- Communes of the Charente-Maritime department
