= Sainte-Ramée =

- Commune
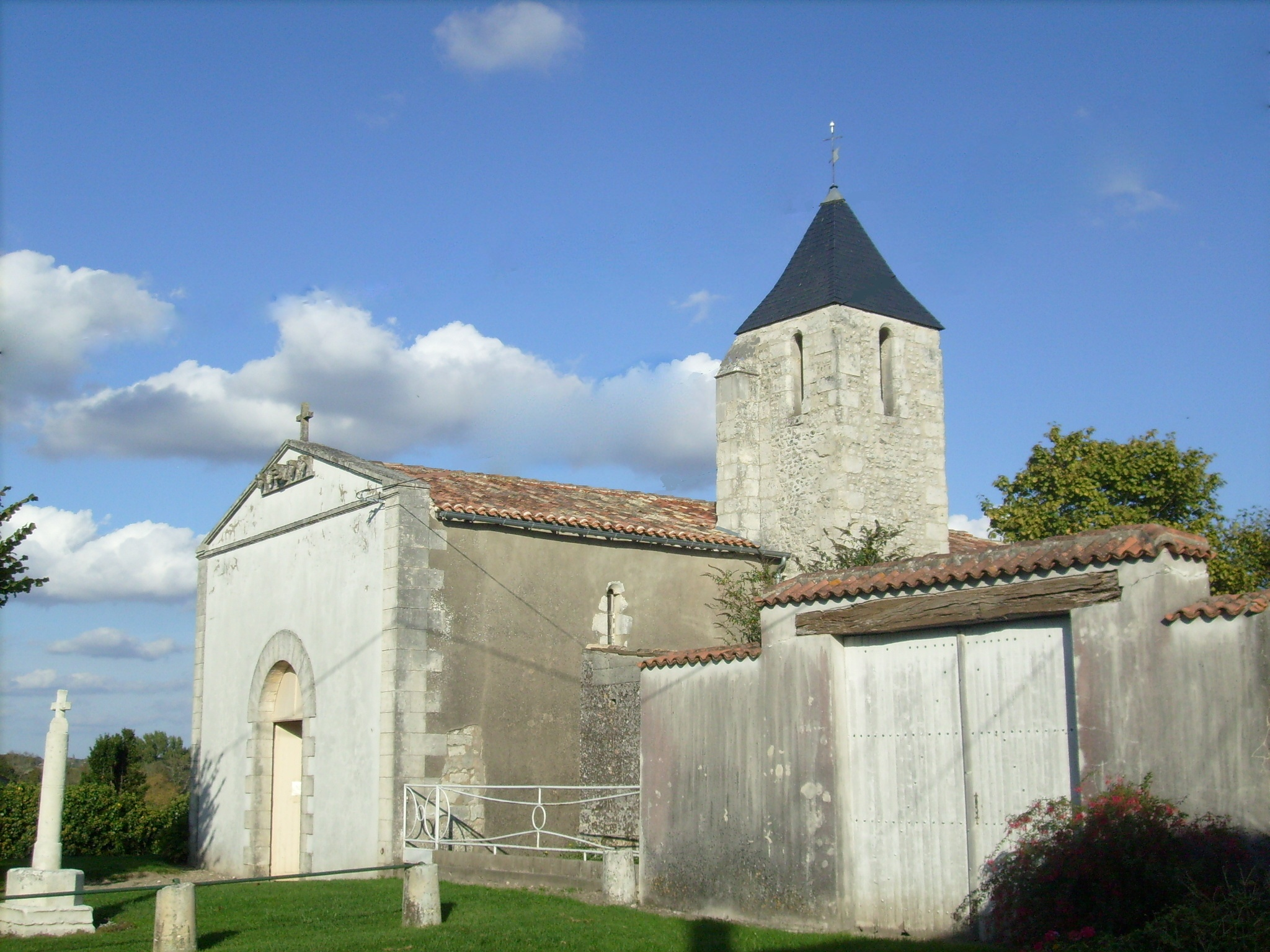
- The church in Sainte-Ramée
- Location of Sainte-Ramée
- Location within France Location within Nouvelle-Aquitaine
- Coordinates: 45°25′28″N 0°39′36″W
- Country: France
- Region: Nouvelle-Aquitaine
- Department: Charente-Maritime
- Arrondissement: Jonzac
- Canton: Pons

Government
  - Mayor (2020–2026): Fabrice Olivier
- Area^{1}: 4.67 km^{2} (1.80 sq mi)
- Highest elevation: 80 m (260 ft)
- Lowest elevation: 8 m (26 ft)
- Population (2023): 113
  - Density: 24.2/km^{2} (62.7/sq mi)
- Time zone: UTC+01:00 (CET)
  - Summer (DST): UTC+02:00 (CEST)
- INSEE/Postal code: 17390 /17240
- ^{1} French Land Register data, which excludes lakes, ponds, glaciers > 1 km^{2} (0.386 sq mi or 247 acres) and river estuaries.

Sainte-Ramée (French pronunciation: [sɛ̃t ʁame]) is a commune in the Charente-Maritime department in the Nouvelle-Aquitaine region in southwestern France.

== Population ==
Historical population
Year	Pop.	±% p.a.
1968	186	—
1975	181	−0.39%
1982	175	−0.48%
1990	144	−2.41%
1999	126	−1.47%
2007	124	−0.20%
2012	141	+2.60%
2017	121	−3.01%
2023	113	−1.13%
Source: INSEE

== See also ==
- Communes of the Charente-Maritime department
