= Saint-Ciers-du-Taillon =

- Commune
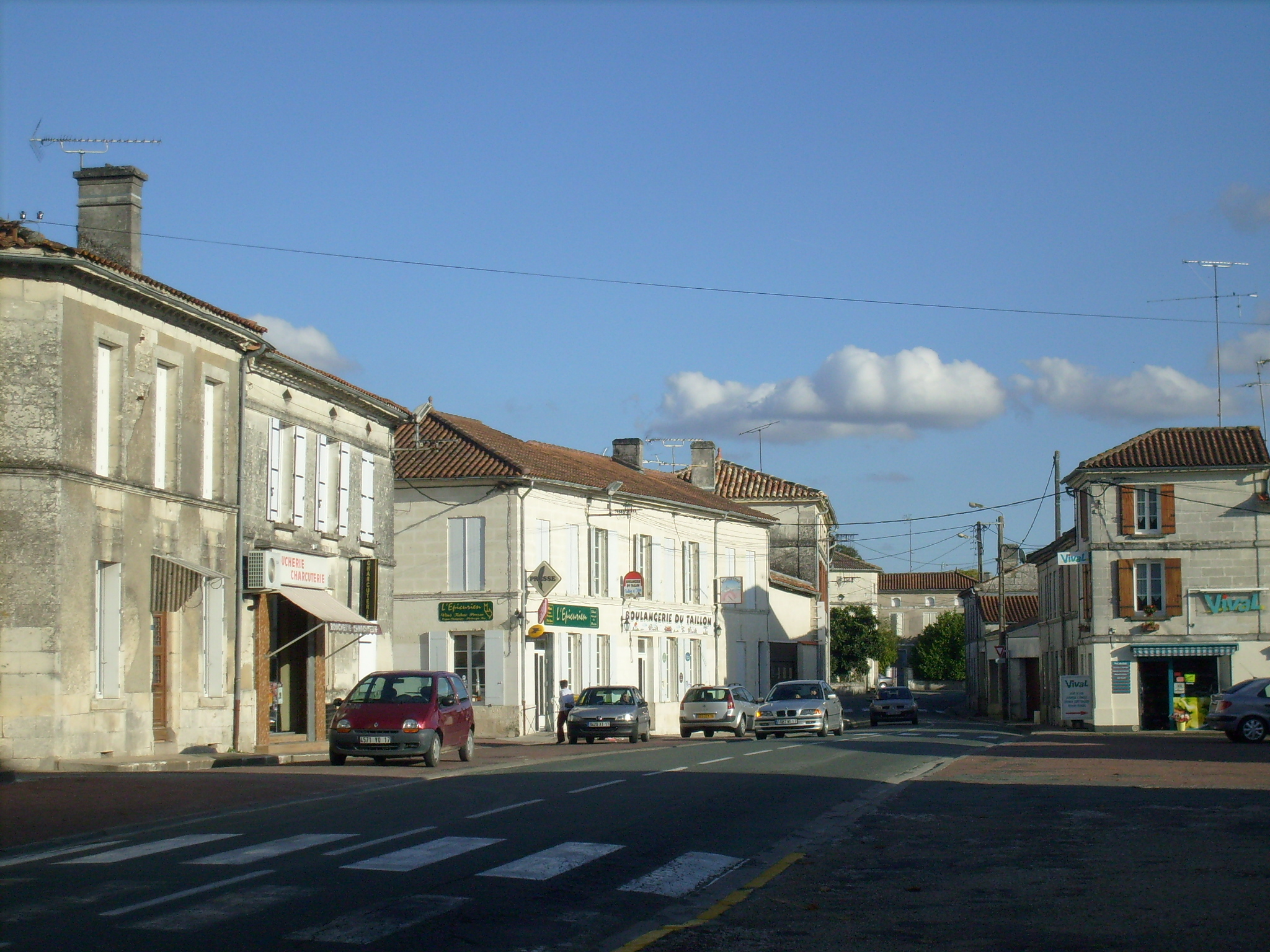
- A view within Saint-Ciers-du-Taillon
- Location of Saint-Ciers-du-Taillon
- Location within France Location within Nouvelle-Aquitaine
- Coordinates: 45°25′26″N 0°38′20″W
- Country: France
- Region: Nouvelle-Aquitaine
- Department: Charente-Maritime
- Arrondissement: Jonzac
- Canton: Pons

Government
  - Mayor (2020–2026): Patrick Chérat
- Area^{1}: 22.1 km^{2} (8.5 sq mi)
- Highest elevation: 101 m (331 ft)
- Lowest elevation: 14 m (46 ft)
- Population (2023): 581
  - Density: 26.3/km^{2} (68.1/sq mi)
- Time zone: UTC+01:00 (CET)
  - Summer (DST): UTC+02:00 (CEST)
- INSEE/Postal code: 17317 /17240
- ^{1} French Land Register data, which excludes lakes, ponds, glaciers > 1 km^{2} (0.386 sq mi or 247 acres) and river estuaries.

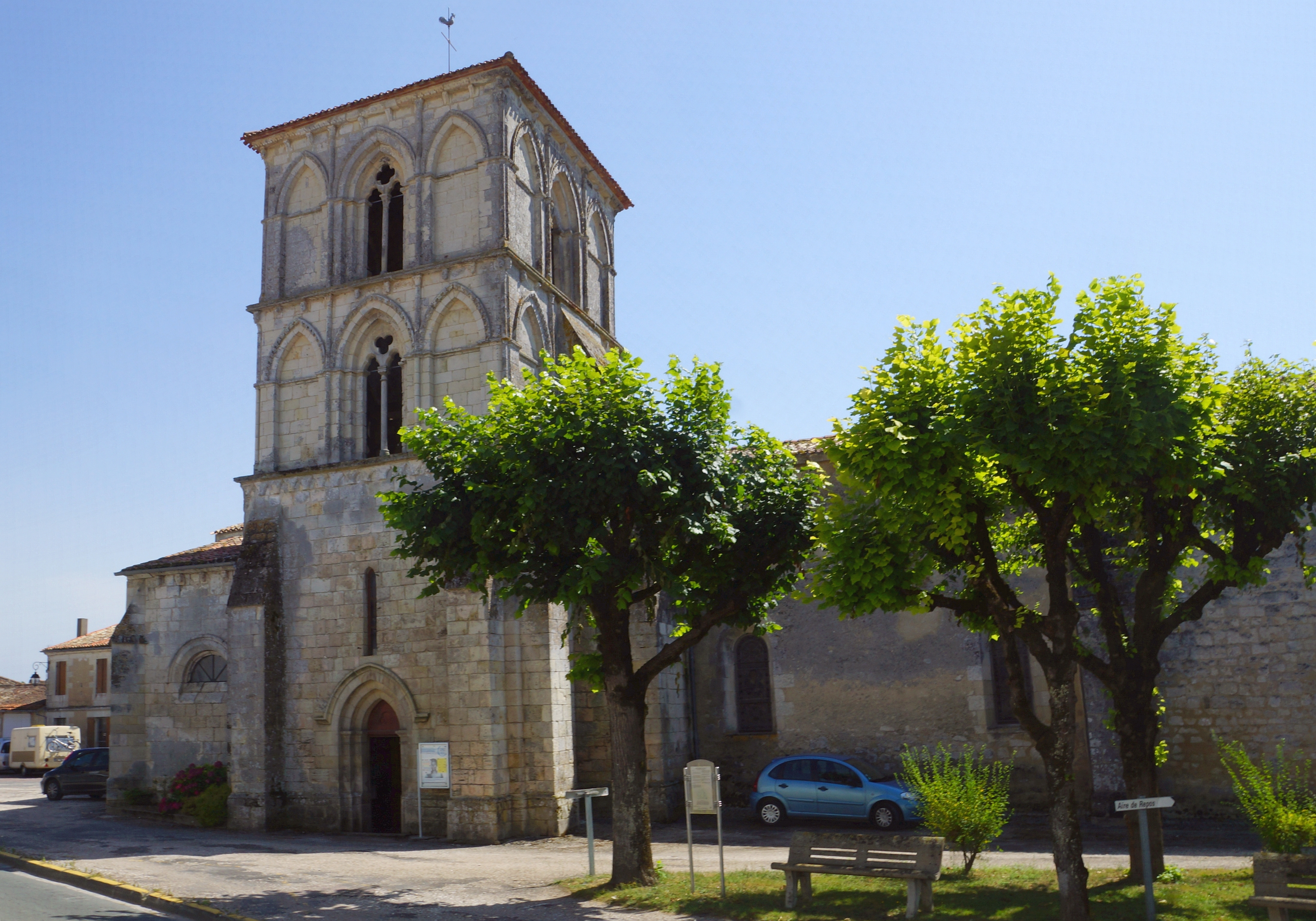
Church Saint-Cyriaque 12-13th century - Saint-Ciers-du-Taillon (2013)

Saint-Ciers-du-Taillon (French pronunciation: [sɛ̃ sje dy tajɔ̃]) is a commune in the Charente-Maritime department in the Nouvelle-Aquitaine region in southwestern France.

== Population ==
Historical population
Year	Pop.	±% p.a.
1968	727	—
1975	634	−1.94%
1982	576	−1.36%
1990	569	−0.15%
1999	524	−0.91%
2007	498	−0.63%
2012	563	+2.48%
2017	550	−0.47%
2023	581	+0.92%
Source: INSEE

== See also ==
- Communes of the Charente-Maritime department
