= Courpignac =

- Commune
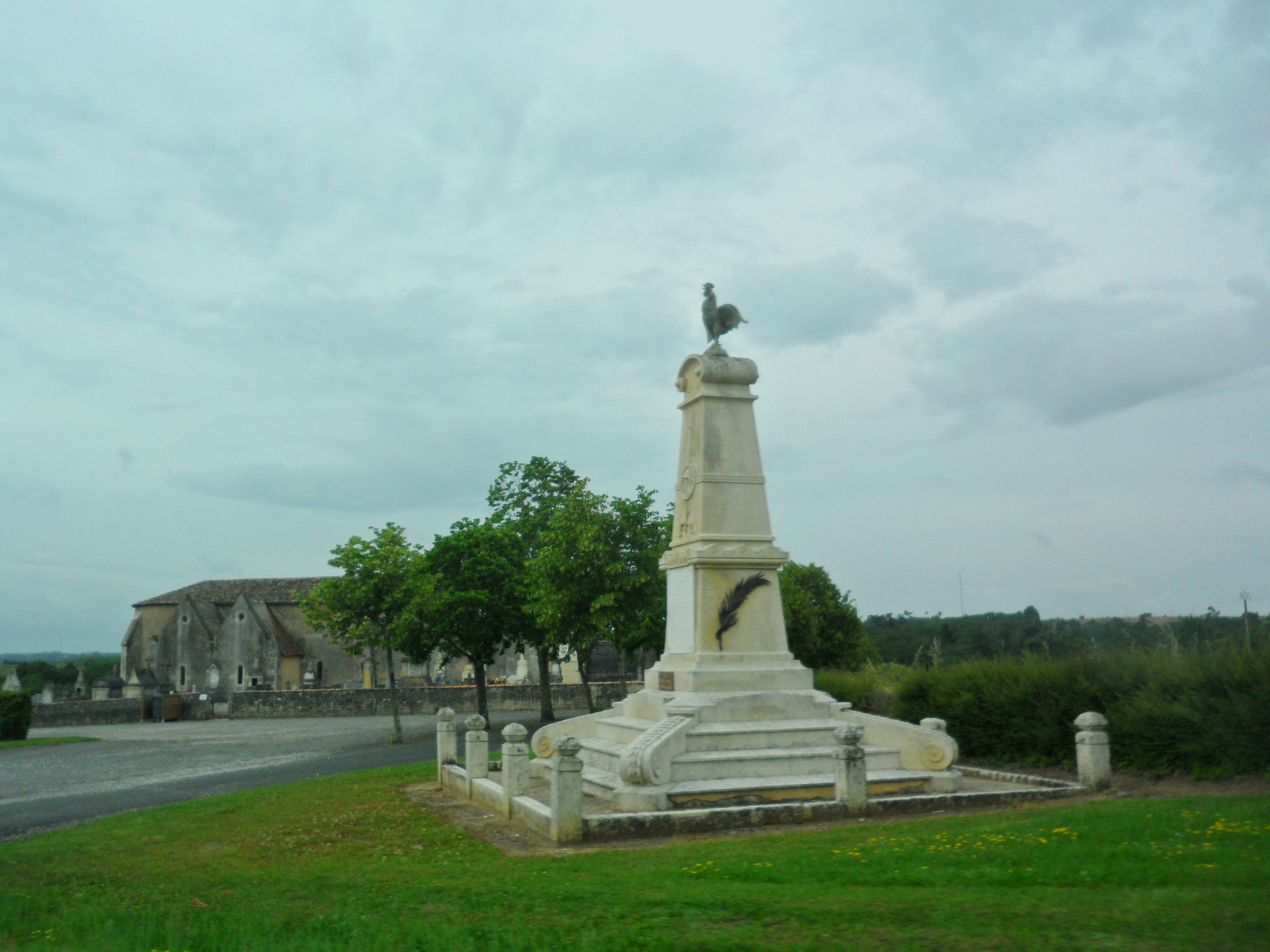
- War memorial
- Location of Courpignac
- Location within France Location within Nouvelle-Aquitaine
- Coordinates: 45°19′42″N 0°29′09″W
- Country: France
- Region: Nouvelle-Aquitaine
- Department: Charente-Maritime
- Arrondissement: Jonzac
- Canton: Pons

Government
  - Mayor (2020–2026): Eliane Marsaud
- Area^{1}: 14.97 km^{2} (5.78 sq mi)
- Highest elevation: 96 m (315 ft)
- Lowest elevation: 18 m (59 ft)
- Population (2023): 421
  - Density: 28.1/km^{2} (72.8/sq mi)
- Time zone: UTC+01:00 (CET)
  - Summer (DST): UTC+02:00 (CEST)
- INSEE/Postal code: 17129 /17130
- ^{1} French Land Register data, which excludes lakes, ponds, glaciers > 1 km^{2} (0.386 sq mi or 247 acres) and river estuaries.

Courpignac (French pronunciation: [kuʁpiɲak]) is a commune in the Charente-Maritime department in the Nouvelle-Aquitaine region in southwestern France.

== Population ==
Historical population
Year	Pop.	±% p.a.
1968	396	—
1975	347	−1.87%
1982	339	−0.33%
1990	341	+0.07%
1999	359	+0.57%
2007	403	+1.46%
2012	413	+0.49%
2017	412	−0.05%
2023	421	+0.36%
Source: INSEE

== See also ==
- Communes of the Charente-Maritime department
