= Mazerolles, Charente-Maritime =

Mazerolles
- Commune
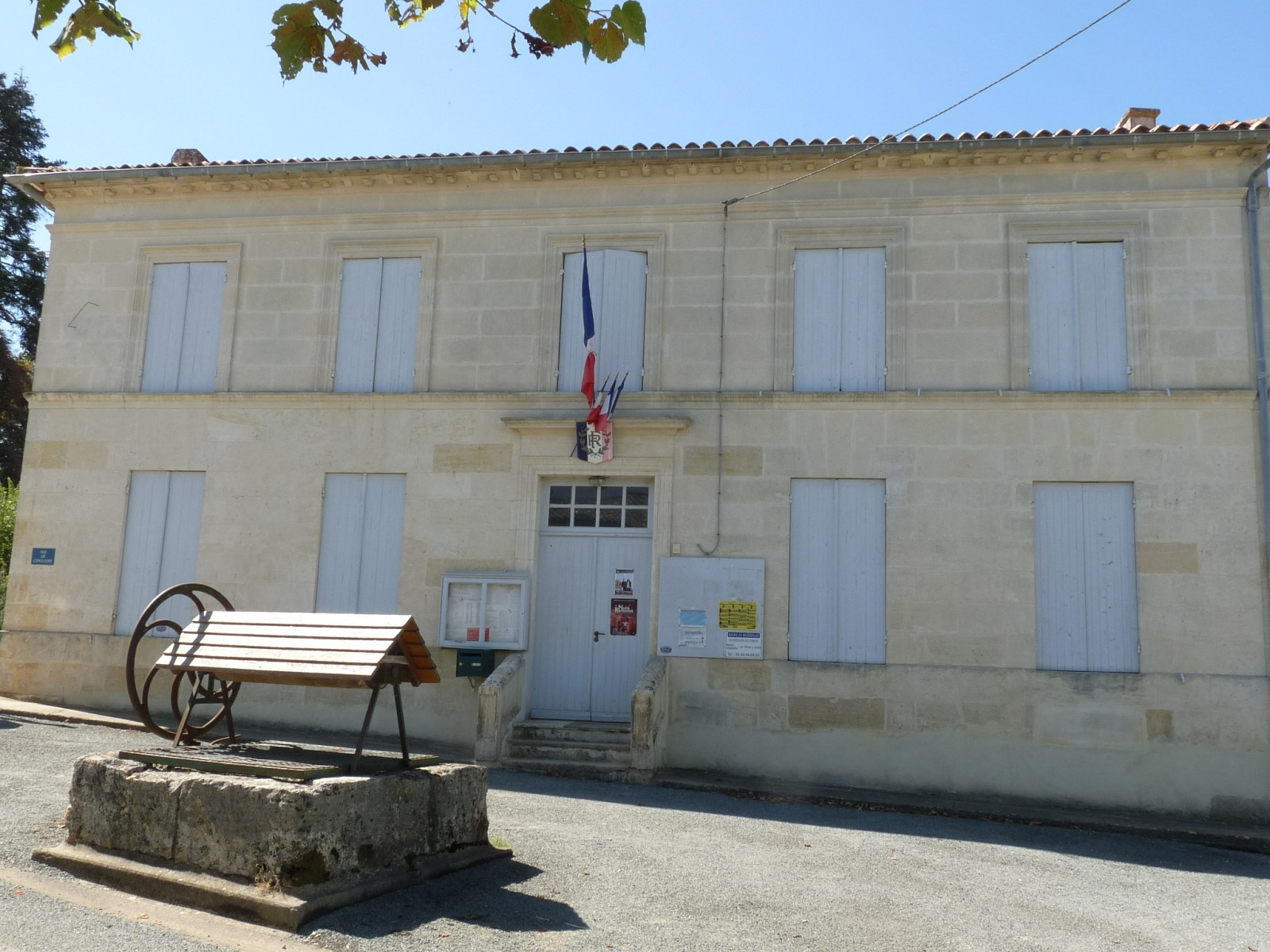
- The town hall in Mazerolles
- Location of Mazerolles
- Location within France Location within Nouvelle-Aquitaine
- Coordinates: 45°33′24″N 0°35′16″W
- Country: France
- Region: Nouvelle-Aquitaine
- Department: Charente-Maritime
- Arrondissement: Jonzac
- Canton: Pons

Government
  - Mayor (2021–2026): Michel Talbot
- Area^{1}: 5.23 km^{2} (2.02 sq mi)
- Highest elevation: 47 m (154 ft)
- Lowest elevation: 24 m (79 ft)
- Population (2023): 243
  - Density: 46.5/km^{2} (120/sq mi)
- Time zone: UTC+01:00 (CET)
  - Summer (DST): UTC+02:00 (CEST)
- INSEE/Postal code: 17227 /17800
- ^{1} French Land Register data, which excludes lakes, ponds, glaciers > 1 km^{2} (0.386 sq mi or 247 acres) and river estuaries.

Mazerolles (French pronunciation: [mazʁɔl]) is a commune in the Charente-Maritime department in southwestern France.

== Population ==
Historical population
Year	Pop.	±% p.a.
1968	201	—
1975	206	+0.35%
1982	180	−1.91%
1990	187	+0.48%
1999	217	+1.67%
2007	259	+2.24%
2012	249	−0.78%
2017	228	−1.75%
2023	243	+1.07%
Source: INSEE

== See also ==
- Communes of the Charente-Maritime department
