= Plassac, Charente-Maritime =

Plassac
- Commune
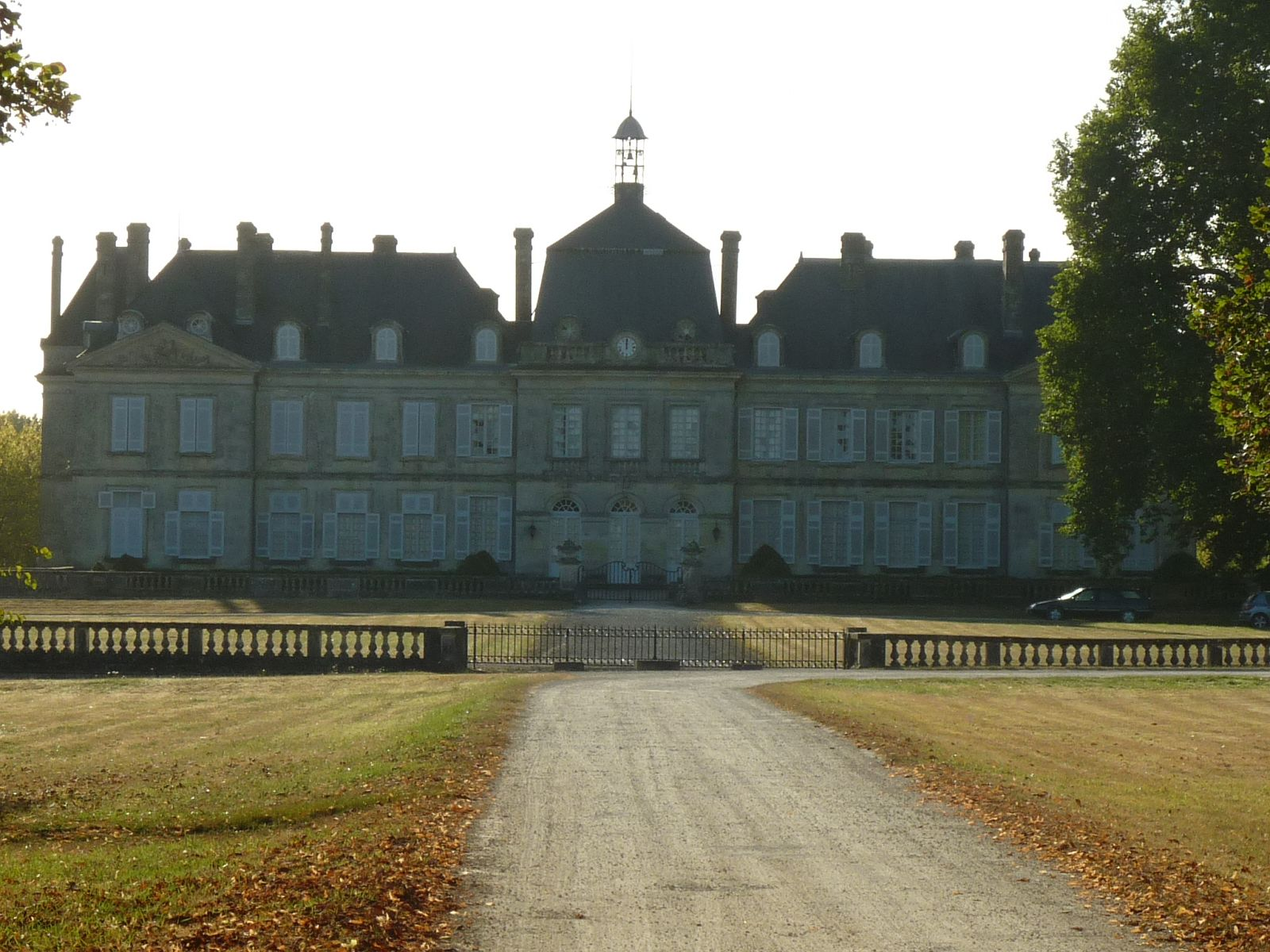
- Chateau
- Location of Plassac
- Location within France Location within Nouvelle-Aquitaine
- Coordinates: 45°28′02″N 0°34′03″W
- Country: France
- Region: Nouvelle-Aquitaine
- Department: Charente-Maritime
- Arrondissement: Jonzac
- Canton: Pons
- Intercommunality: Haute-Saintonge

Government
  - Mayor (2020–2026): Jean-Charles Langlais
- Area^{1}: 15.48 km^{2} (5.98 sq mi)
- Highest elevation: 65 m (213 ft)
- Lowest elevation: 27 m (89 ft)
- Population (2023): 677
  - Density: 43.7/km^{2} (113/sq mi)
- Time zone: UTC+01:00 (CET)
  - Summer (DST): UTC+02:00 (CEST)
- INSEE/Postal code: 17279 /17240
- ^{1} French Land Register data, which excludes lakes, ponds, glaciers > 1 km^{2} (0.386 sq mi or 247 acres) and river estuaries.

Plassac (French pronunciation: [plasak]) is a commune in the Charente-Maritime department in southwestern France.

== Population ==
Historical population
Year	Pop.	±% p.a.
1968	384	—
1975	368	−0.61%
1982	339	−1.17%
1990	387	+1.67%
1999	388	+0.03%
2007	563	+4.76%
2012	650	+2.92%
2017	597	−1.69%
2023	677	+2.12%
Source: INSEE

== See also ==
- Communes of the Charente-Maritime department
