= Messac =

Messac may refer to:

== Persons ==
- Achille Messac, aerospace engineer
- Magali Messac, ballet dancer

== Places ==
- Messac, Charente-Maritime
- Messac, Ille-et-Vilaine
