= Saint-Palais-de-Négrignac =

- Commune
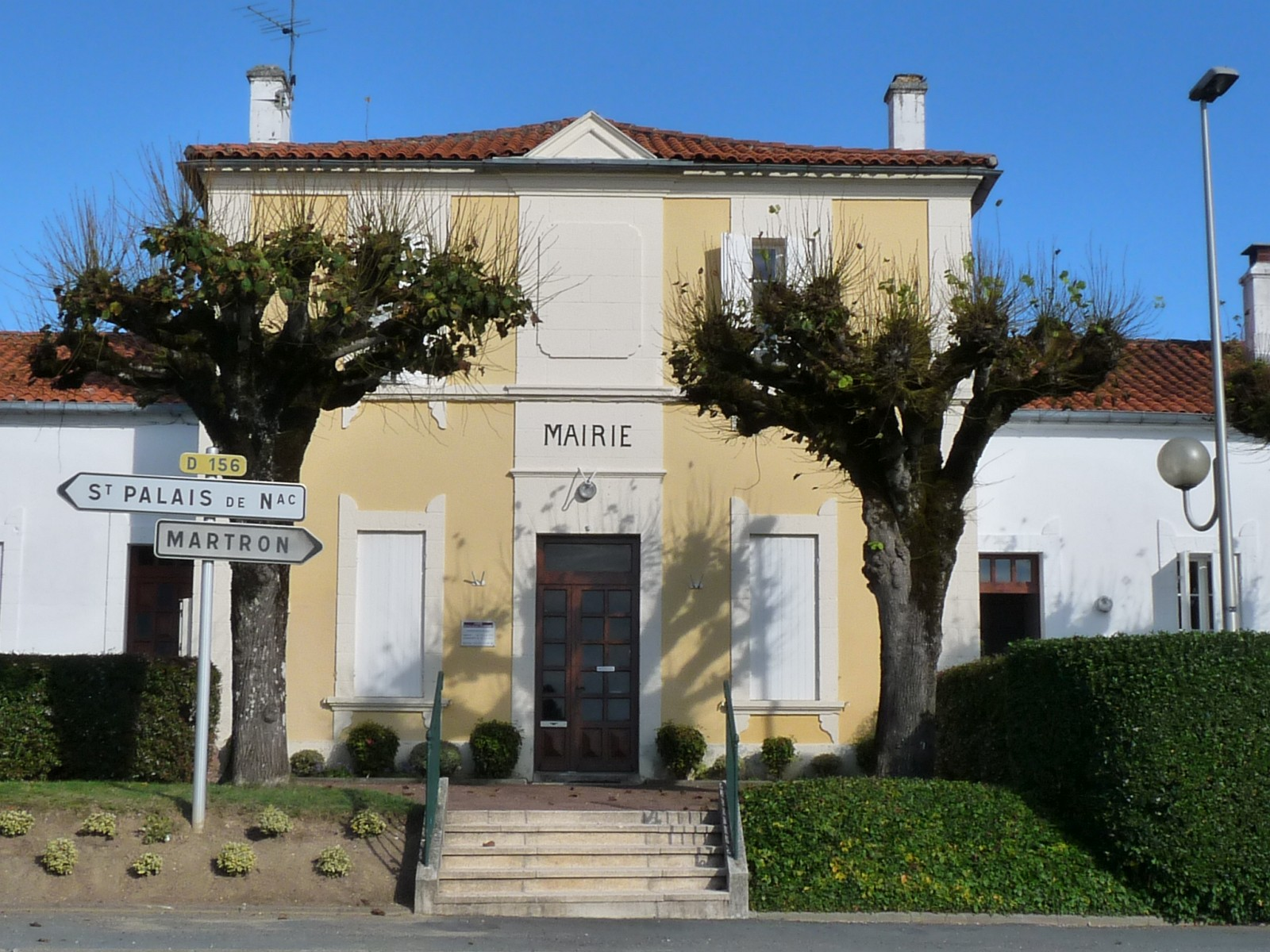
- The town hall in Saint-Palais-de-Négrignac
- Location of Saint-Palais-de-Négrignac
- Location within France Location within Nouvelle-Aquitaine
- Coordinates: 45°16′04″N 0°13′24″W
- Country: France
- Region: Nouvelle-Aquitaine
- Department: Charente-Maritime
- Arrondissement: Jonzac
- Canton: Les Trois Monts
- Intercommunality: Haute-Saintonge

Government
  - Mayor (2020–2026): Dominique Marchesin
- Area^{1}: 18.51 km^{2} (7.15 sq mi)
- Elevation: 130 m (430 ft)
- Highest elevation: 141 m (463 ft)
- Lowest elevation: 53 m (174 ft)
- Population (2023): 410
  - Density: 22/km^{2} (57/sq mi)
- Time zone: UTC+01:00 (CET)
  - Summer (DST): UTC+02:00 (CEST)
- INSEE/Postal code: 17378 /17220
- ^{1} French Land Register data, which excludes lakes, ponds, glaciers > 1 km^{2} (0.386 sq mi or 247 acres) and river estuaries.

Saint-Palais-de-Négrignac (French pronunciation: [sɛ̃ palɛ də neɡʁiɲak]) is a commune in the Charente-Maritime department in the Nouvelle-Aquitaine region in southwestern France.

== Population ==
Historical population
Year	Pop.	±% p.a.
1968	446	—
1975	407	−1.30%
1982	388	−0.68%
1990	351	−1.24%
1999	329	−0.72%
2007	370	+1.48%
2012	413	+2.22%
2017	438	+1.18%
2023	410	−1.09%
Source: INSEE

== Geography ==
Saint-Palais-de-Négrignac is located about 51 km north-northeast of Bordeaux, on the Lary River. The Mouzon runs through the eastern part of the commune. Saint-Palais-de-Négrignac is bordered by Chevanceaux to the north, Neuvicq to the east and south, Montlieu-la-Garde to the south and southwest, and Pouillac to the west.

The RN 10 passes through the commune.

== See also ==
- Communes of the Charente-Maritime department
