= Coux =

Coux may refer to the following communes in France:

- Coux, Ardèche, in the Ardèche département
- Coux, Charente-Maritime, in the Charente-Maritime département
- Coux-et-Bigaroque, in the Dordogne département

== See also ==
- Coup
