= La Genétouze =

La Genétouze may refer to the following places in France:

- La Genétouze, Charente-Maritime, a commune in the Charente-Maritime department
- La Genétouze, Vendée, a commune in the Vendée department
