= Bedenac =

- Commune
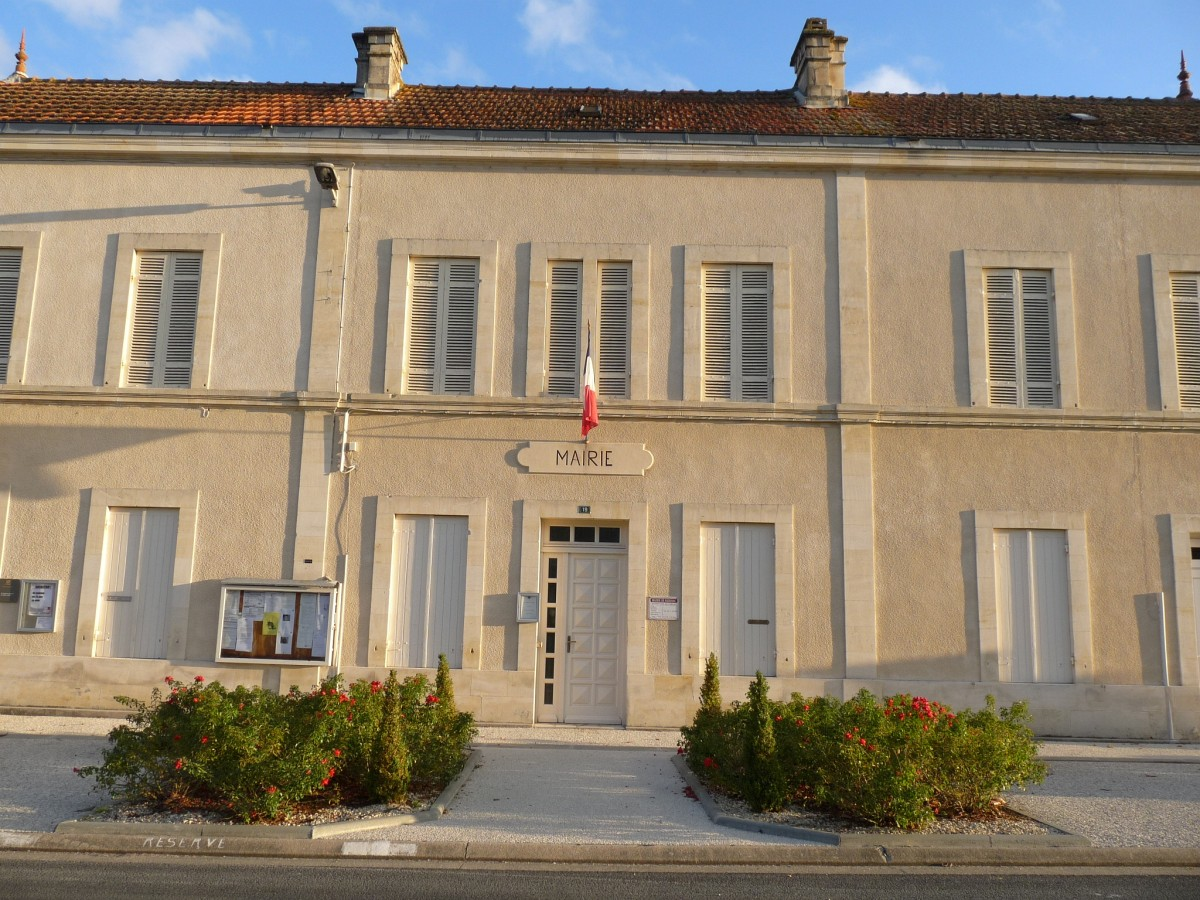
- Town hall in Bedenac

- Coat of arms
- Location of Bedenac
- Location within France Location within Nouvelle-Aquitaine
- Coordinates: 45°09′54″N 0°18′20″W
- Country: France
- Region: Nouvelle-Aquitaine
- Department: Charente-Maritime
- Arrondissement: Jonzac
- Canton: Les Trois Monts

Government
  - Mayor (2020–2026): Alain Laparliere
- Area^{1}: 40.23 km^{2} (15.53 sq mi)
- Elevation: 60 m (200 ft)
- Highest elevation: 109 m (358 ft)
- Lowest elevation: 44 m (144 ft)
- Population (2023): 699
  - Density: 17.4/km^{2} (45.0/sq mi)
- Time zone: UTC+01:00 (CET)
  - Summer (DST): UTC+02:00 (CEST)
- INSEE/Postal code: 17038 /17220
- ^{1} French Land Register data, which excludes lakes, ponds, glaciers > 1 km^{2} (0.386 sq mi or 247 acres) and river estuaries.

Bedenac (French pronunciation: [bedənak]; also Bédenac) is a commune in the Charente-Maritime in the department in the Nouvelle-Aquitaine region in southwestern France. It is one of the largest communes in the department, in terms of land area.

== Geography ==
A rural and heavily forested commune located in the canton of Les Trois Monts.

=== Neighboring communes ===
The neighbouring communes are Bussac-Forêt, Clérac, Lapouyade, Laruscade and Montlieu-la-Garde.

=== Hydrography ===
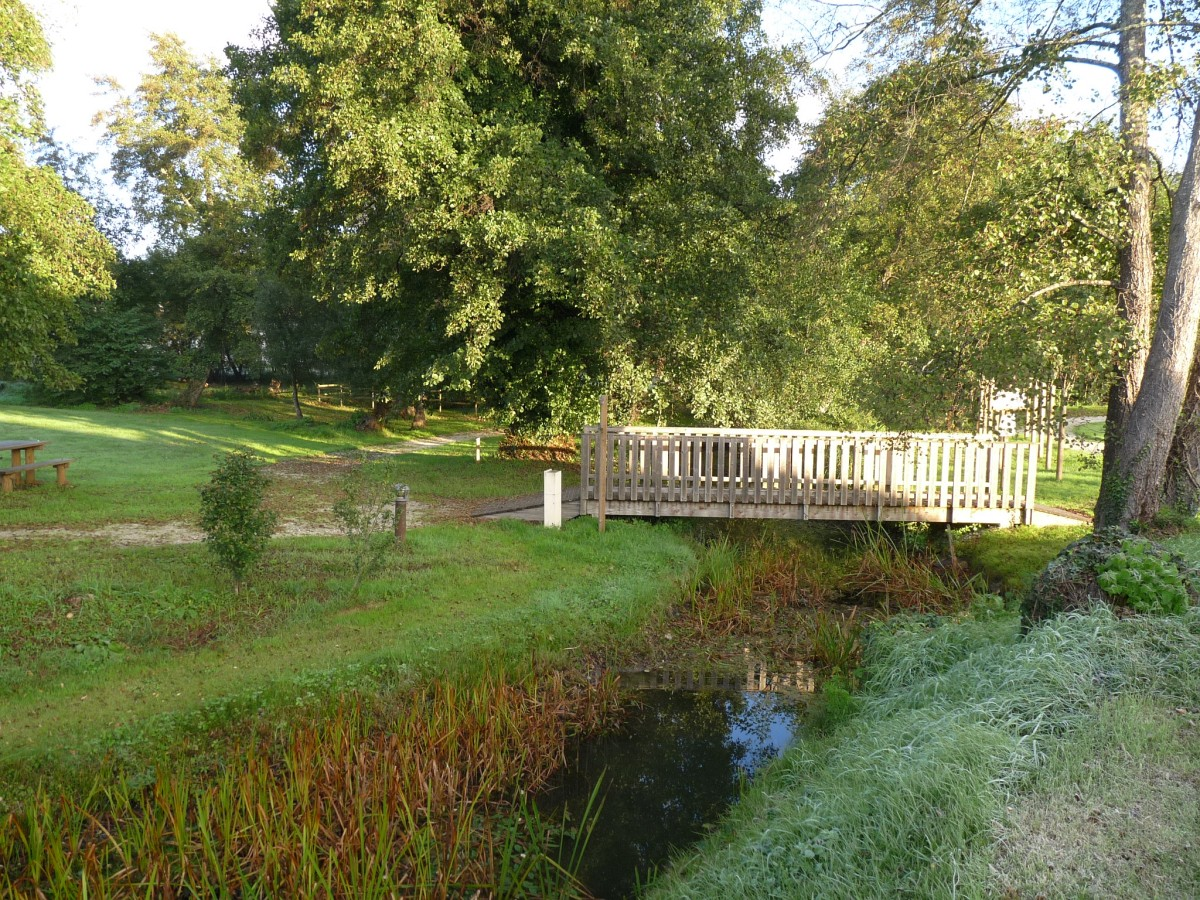
The Meudon river flows through the town

The Meudon flows through the commune and the town. Heading south, it is a tributary of the Saye, itself a tributary of the Isle and therefore of the Dordogne.

== Name ==
Bedenac originates from the name of a Gallo-Roman landowner named Bitinus, followed by the suffix -acum.

The place name Chierzac comes from the personal name Ceretius, followed by the suffix -acum.

== History ==
On the road between Paris and Bordeaux, an undocumented local legend claims that the modest village of Bedenac was once visited by Anne of Austria.

Between 1795 and 1800, the village of Bedenac absorbed the village of Cierzac, also spelled Chierzac.

== Population ==
Historical population
Year	Pop.	±% p.a.
1968	475	—
1975	437	−1.18%
1982	431	−0.20%
1990	494	+1.72%
1999	509	+0.33%
2007	571	+1.45%
2012	666	+3.13%
2017	686	+0.59%
2023	699	+0.31%
Source: INSEE

== Facilities, services and local life ==
- School.
- Post office.
- Library.
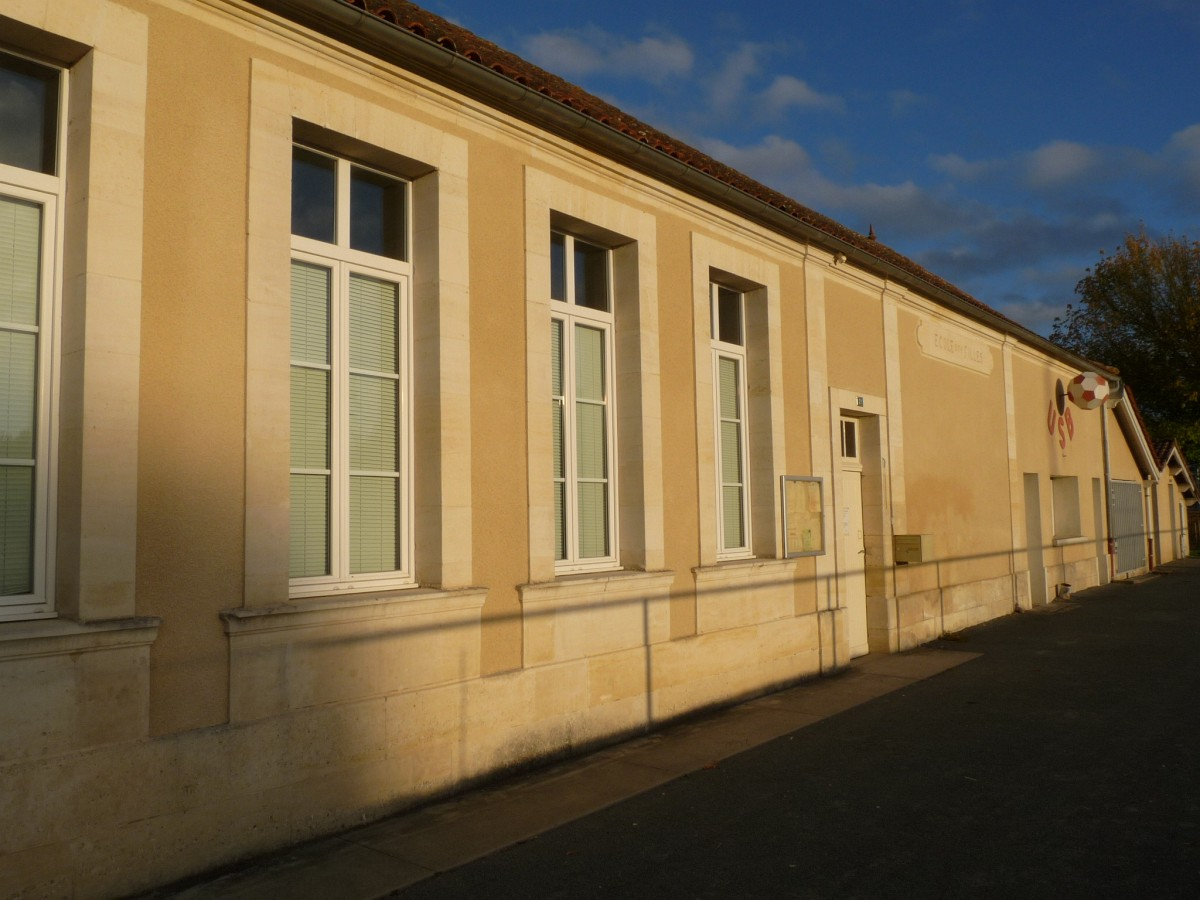
The USB school and football club.

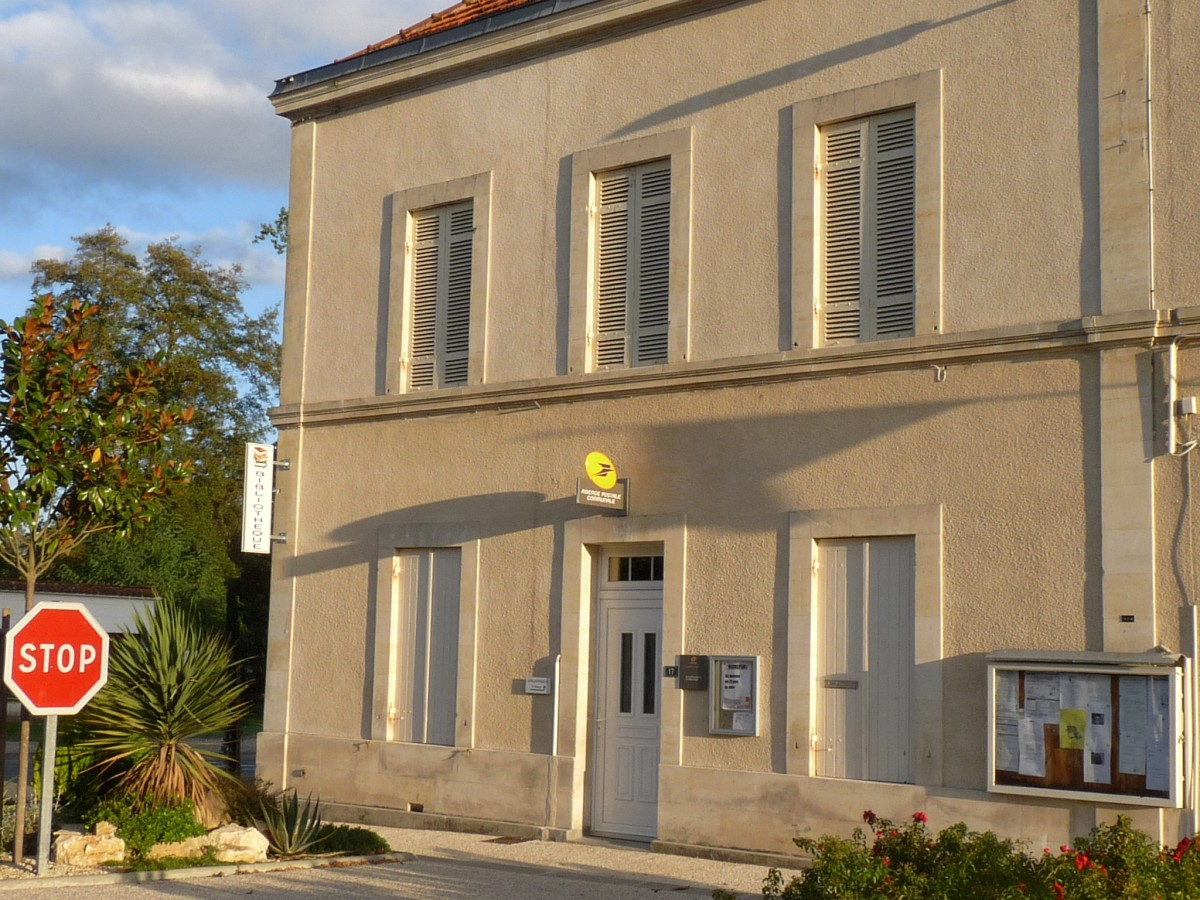
The post office and the library.

== Local culture and heritage ==
=== Places and monuments ===
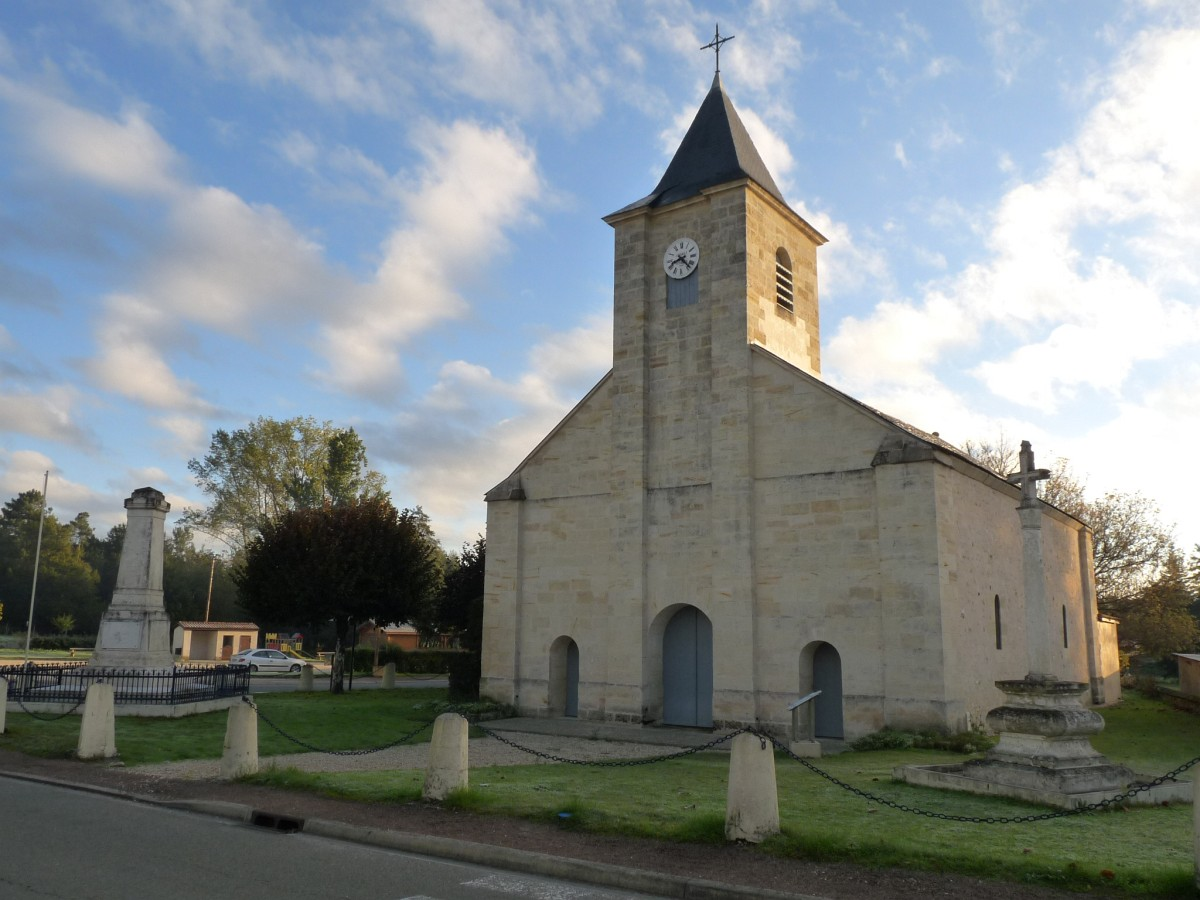
The church, the war memorial and the mission cross.

The church in Bedenac is of Romanesque origin. It was ruined in the 16th century and is said to have been rebuilt following a vow made by Anne of Austria, wife of Louis XIII, whose carriage reportedly encountered difficulties passing through the village, which at the time lay on the royal road between Paris and Madrid.

Having become too small, it was rebuilt in 1854. It is unusual in that it was constructed without any reference to a church in the region.

=== Heraldry ===
Arms of Bedenac	Party: 1st Or, a maritime pine cut proper, 2nd Azure, a silver mitre accompanied by three gold fleurs-de-lis, all surmounted by a wavy chief gules charged with three gold chevrons arranged fesswise. Details: The maritime pine evokes a forest commune, the mitre and the fleur-de-lis are the symbols of Saintonge, the wavy chief represents the Meudon which waters the commune and the three chevrons, the three hills of the commune. Created by Jean-François Binon, adopted in 2021.

== See also ==
- Communes of the Charente-Maritime department
