= Canton of Les Trois Monts =

Coordinates: 45.28°N 0.41°W

The canton of Les Trois Monts is an administrative division of the Charente-Maritime department, western France. It was created at the French canton reorganisation which came into effect in March 2015. Its seat is in Montendre.

It consists of the following communes:

1. La Barde
2. Bedenac
3. Boresse-et-Martron
4. Boscamnant
5. Bran
6. Bussac-Forêt
7. Cercoux
8. Chamouillac
9. Chartuzac
10. Chatenet
11. Chepniers
12. Chevanceaux
13. Clérac
14. La Clotte
15. Corignac
16. Coux
17. Expiremont
18. Le Fouilloux
19. La Genétouze
20. Jussas
21. Mérignac
22. Messac
23. Montendre
24. Montguyon
25. Montlieu-la-Garde
26. Neuvicq
27. Orignolles
28. Le Pin
29. Polignac
30. Pommiers-Moulons
31. Pouillac
32. Rouffignac
33. Saint-Aigulin
34. Sainte-Colombe
35. Saint-Martin-d'Ary
36. Saint-Martin-de-Coux
37. Saint-Palais-de-Négrignac
38. Saint-Pierre-du-Palais
39. Souméras
40. Sousmoulins
41. Tugéras-Saint-Maurice
42. Vanzac
