= Boscamnant =

- Commune
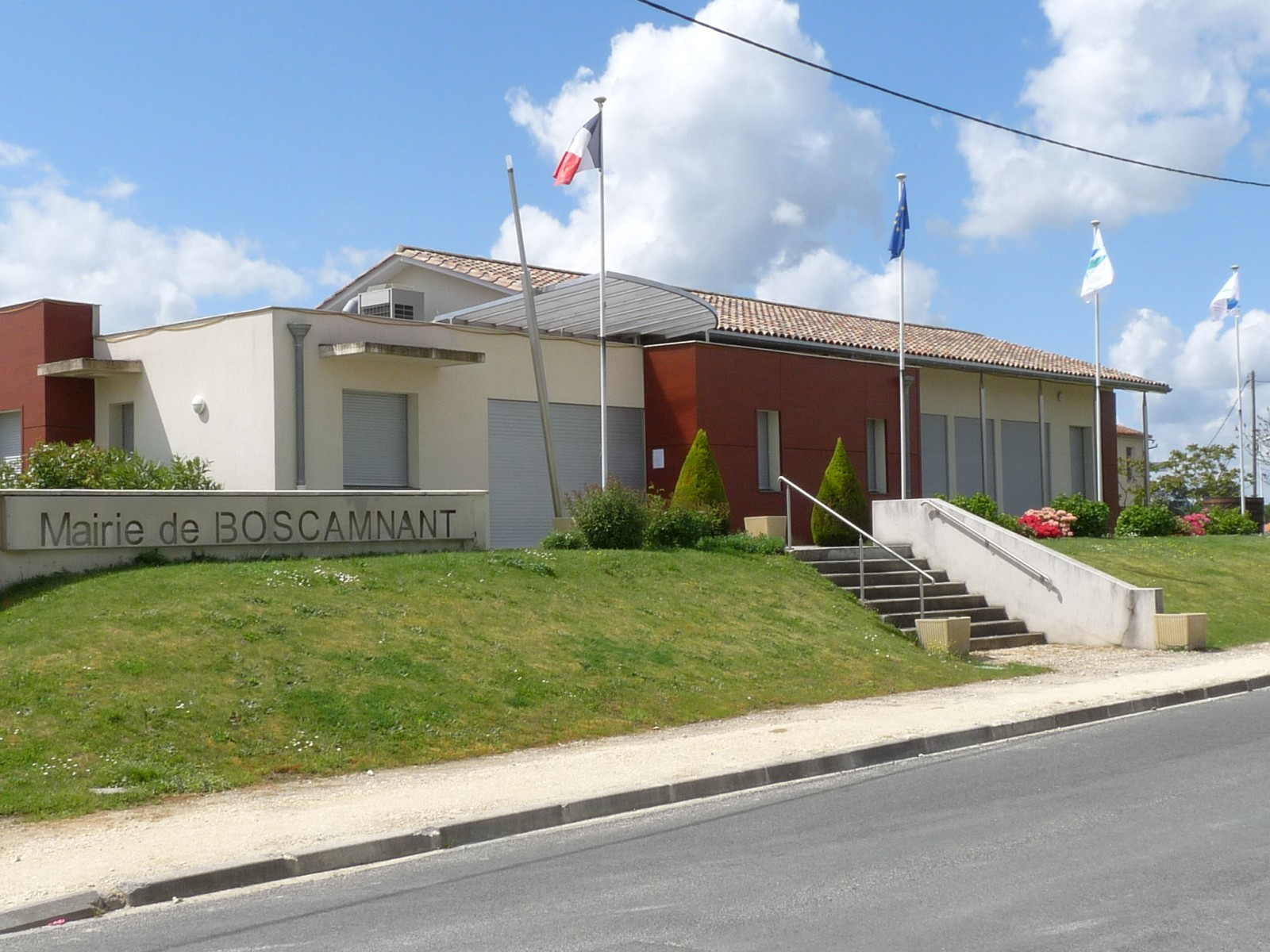
- The town hall in Boscamnant
- Location of Boscamnant
- Location within France Location within Nouvelle-Aquitaine
- Coordinates: 45°11′53″N 0°04′02″W
- Country: France
- Region: Nouvelle-Aquitaine
- Department: Charente-Maritime
- Arrondissement: Jonzac
- Canton: Les Trois Monts
- Intercommunality: Haute-Saintonge

Government
  - Mayor (2020–2026): Pierre Borde
- Area^{1}: 13.98 km^{2} (5.40 sq mi)
- Elevation: 84 m (276 ft)
- Highest elevation: 117 m (384 ft)
- Lowest elevation: 27 m (89 ft)
- Population (2023): 330
  - Density: 24/km^{2} (61/sq mi)
- Time zone: UTC+01:00 (CET)
  - Summer (DST): UTC+02:00 (CEST)
- INSEE/Postal code: 17055 /17360
- ^{1} French Land Register data, which excludes lakes, ponds, glaciers > 1 km^{2} (0.386 sq mi or 247 acres) and river estuaries.

Boscamnant is a commune in the Charente-Maritime department in southwestern France. Its mayor is Pierre Borde, elected in 2020.

== Population ==
Historical population
Year	Pop.	±% p.a.
1968	331	—
1975	363	+1.33%
1982	373	+0.39%
1990	321	−1.86%
1999	346	+0.84%
2007	339	−0.26%
2012	418	+4.28%
2017	387	−1.53%
2023	330	−2.62%
Source: INSEE

== See also ==
- Communes of the Charente-Maritime department
