= Tugéras-Saint-Maurice =

- Commune
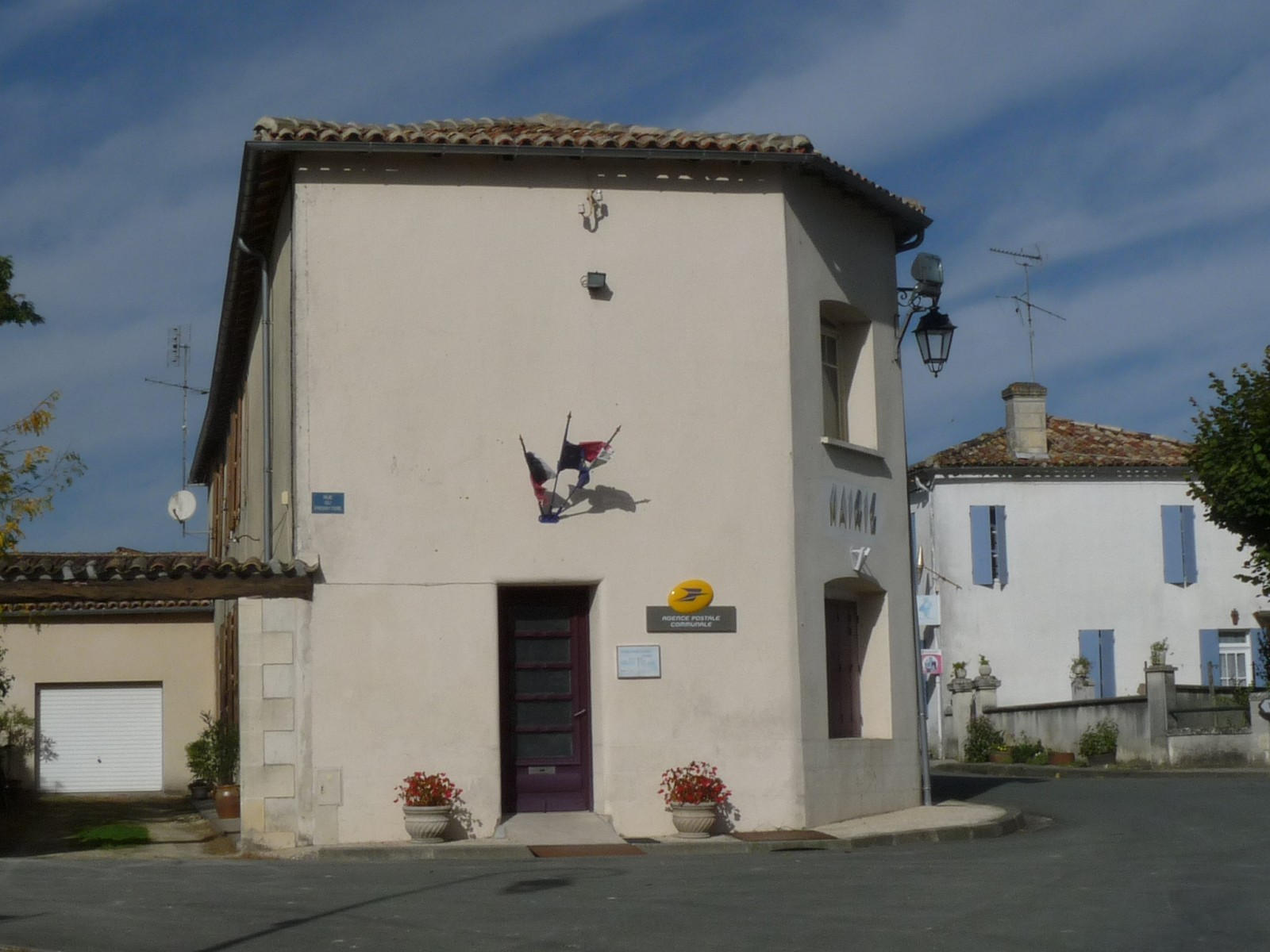
- The town hall in Tugéras
- Location of Tugéras-Saint-Maurice
- Location within France Location within Nouvelle-Aquitaine
- Coordinates: 45°21′38″N 0°24′22″W
- Country: France
- Region: Nouvelle-Aquitaine
- Department: Charente-Maritime
- Arrondissement: Jonzac
- Canton: Les Trois Monts
- Intercommunality: Haute-Saintonge

Government
  - Mayor (2020–2026): Pierre Amat
- Area^{1}: 13.77 km^{2} (5.32 sq mi)
- Elevation: 64 m (210 ft)
- Highest elevation: 108 m (354 ft)
- Lowest elevation: 47 m (154 ft)
- Population (2023): 381
  - Density: 27.7/km^{2} (71.7/sq mi)
- Time zone: UTC+01:00 (CET)
  - Summer (DST): UTC+02:00 (CEST)
- INSEE/Postal code: 17454 /17130
- ^{1} French Land Register data, which excludes lakes, ponds, glaciers > 1 km^{2} (0.386 sq mi or 247 acres) and river estuaries.

Tugéras-Saint-Maurice is a commune in the Charente-Maritime department in southwestern France.

== Population ==
Historical population
Year	Pop.	±% p.a.
1968	358	—
1975	297	−2.63%
1982	333	+1.65%
1990	314	−0.73%
1999	291	−0.84%
2007	332	+1.66%
2012	361	+1.69%
2017	376	+0.82%
2023	381	+0.22%
Source: INSEE

== See also ==
- Communes of the Charente-Maritime department
