= Montendre =

- Commune
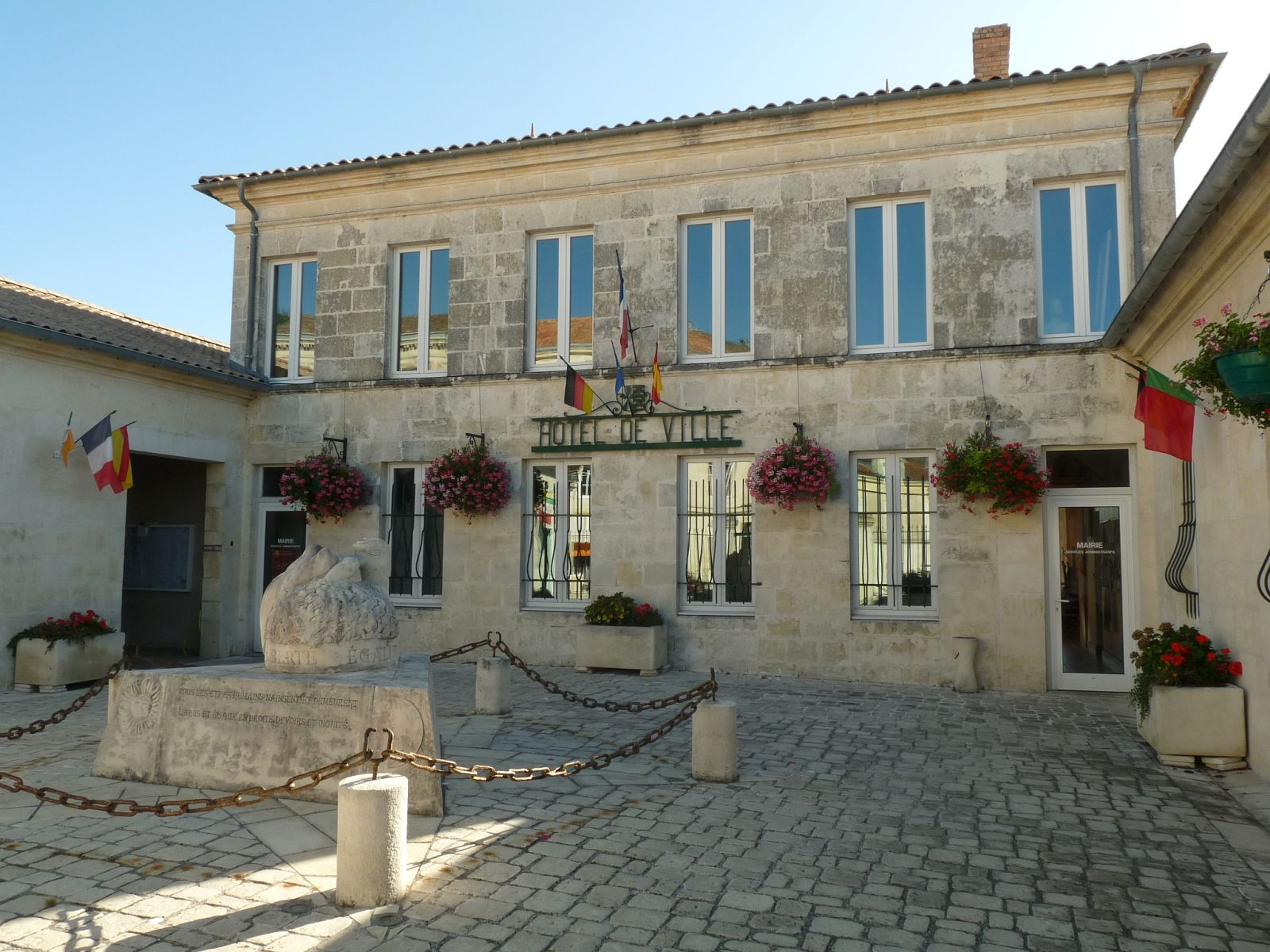
- Town hall

- Coat of arms
- Location of Montendre
- Location within France Location within Nouvelle-Aquitaine
- Coordinates: 45°17′05″N 0°24′27″W
- Country: France
- Region: Nouvelle-Aquitaine
- Department: Charente-Maritime
- Arrondissement: Jonzac
- Canton: Les Trois Monts
- Intercommunality: Haute-Saintonge

Government
  - Mayor (2020–2026): Patrick Giraudeau
- Area^{1}: 25.06 km^{2} (9.68 sq mi)
- Elevation: 86 m (282 ft)
- Highest elevation: 120 m (390 ft)
- Lowest elevation: 44 m (144 ft)
- Population (2023): 3,222
  - Density: 128.6/km^{2} (333.0/sq mi)
- Time zone: UTC+01:00 (CET)
  - Summer (DST): UTC+02:00 (CEST)
- INSEE/Postal code: 17240 /17130
- ^{1} French Land Register data, which excludes lakes, ponds, glaciers > 1 km^{2} (0.386 sq mi or 247 acres) and river estuaries.

Montendre (French pronunciation: [mɔ̃tɑ̃dʁ]) is a commune in the Charente-Maritime department in southwestern France.

== Population ==
In 1972 Montendre absorbed the former communes Chardes and Vallet.

Historical population

Year	Pop.	±% p.a.
1793	837	—
1800	852	+0.25%
1806	852	+0.00%
1821	832	−0.16%
1831	1,023	+2.09%
1836	980	−0.86%
1841	1,041	+1.22%
1846	1,036	−0.10%
1851	1,013	−0.45%
1856	1,031	+0.35%
1861	1,134	+1.92%
1866	1,174	+0.70%
1872	1,273	+1.36%
1876	1,303	+0.58%
1881	1,325	+0.34%
1886	1,399	+1.09%
1891	1,442	+0.61%
1896	1,401	−0.58%
1901	1,488	+1.21%

Year	Pop.	±% p.a.
1906	1,532	+0.58%
1911	1,791	+3.17%
1921	1,807	+0.09%
1926	1,765	−0.47%
1931	1,809	+0.49%
1936	1,763	−0.51%
1946	2,125	+1.89%
1954	2,137	+0.07%
1962	2,760	+3.25%
1968	2,864	+0.62%
1975	3,480	+2.82%
1982	3,330	−0.63%
1990	3,140	−0.73%
1999	3,117	−0.08%
2007	3,146	+0.12%
2012	3,226	+0.50%
2017	3,242	+0.10%
2023	3,222	−0.10%

Source: EHESS and INSEE (1975-2023)

== See also ==
- Communes of the Charente-Maritime department
