= Chartuzac =

- Commune
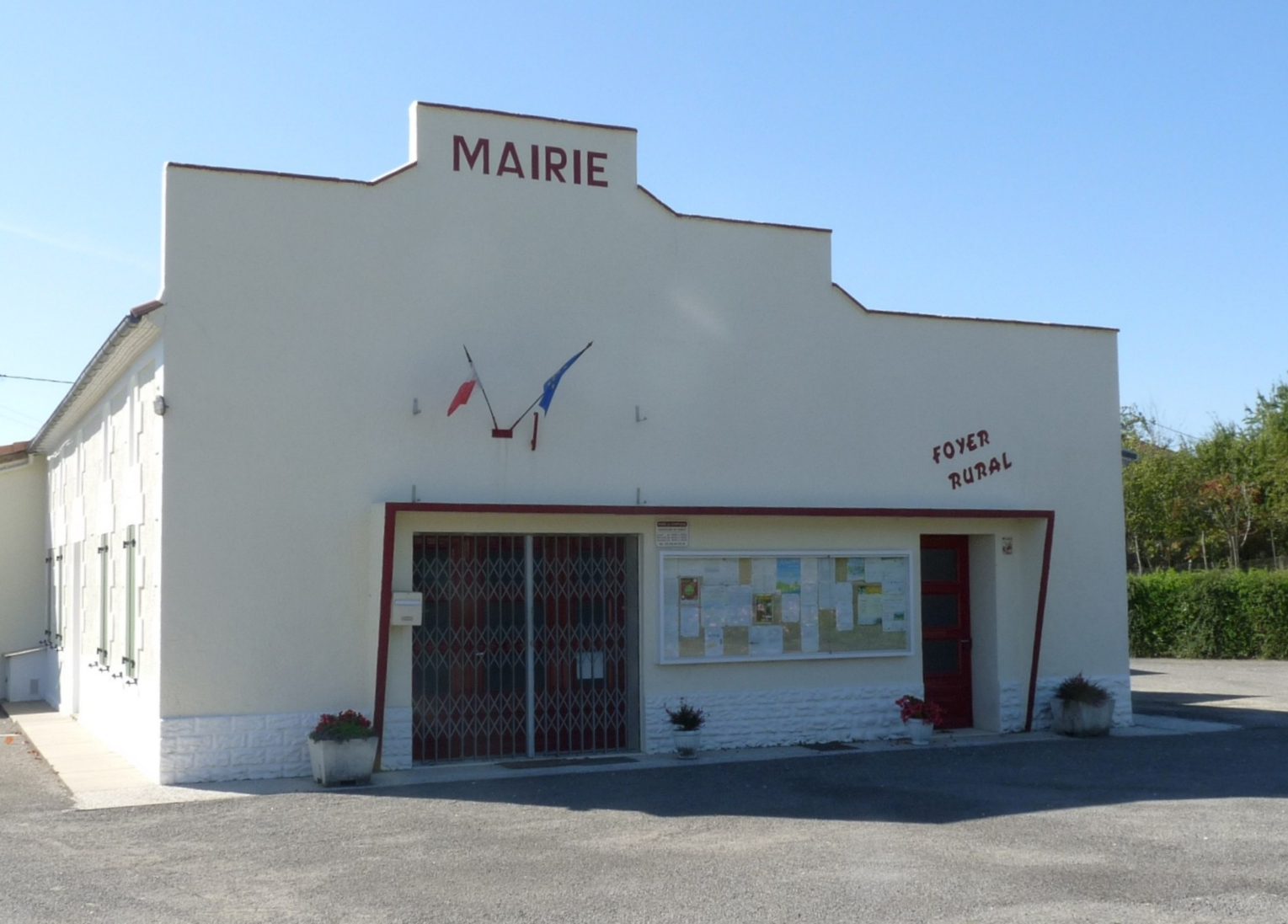
- The town hall in Chartuzac
- Location of Chartuzac
- Location within France Location within Nouvelle-Aquitaine
- Coordinates: 45°20′24″N 0°25′00″W
- Country: France
- Region: Nouvelle-Aquitaine
- Department: Charente-Maritime
- Arrondissement: Jonzac
- Canton: Les Trois Monts
- Intercommunality: Haute-Saintonge

Government
  - Mayor (2020–2026): Pierre Plat
- Area^{1}: 2.38 km^{2} (0.92 sq mi)
- Elevation: 100 m (330 ft)
- Highest elevation: 100 m (330 ft)
- Lowest elevation: 57 m (187 ft)
- Population (2023): 164
  - Density: 68.9/km^{2} (178/sq mi)
- Time zone: UTC+01:00 (CET)
  - Summer (DST): UTC+02:00 (CEST)
- INSEE/Postal code: 17092 /17130
- ^{1} French Land Register data, which excludes lakes, ponds, glaciers > 1 km^{2} (0.386 sq mi or 247 acres) and river estuaries.

Chartuzac (French pronunciation: [ʃaʁtyzak]) is a commune in the Charente-Maritime department in southwestern France.

== Population ==
Historical population
Year	Pop.	±% p.a.
1968	181	—
1975	158	−1.92%
1982	199	+3.35%
1990	167	−2.17%
1999	137	−2.18%
2007	166	+2.43%
2012	158	−0.98%
2017	151	−0.90%
2023	164	+1.39%
Source: INSEE

== See also ==
- Communes of the Charente-Maritime department
