= Souméras =

- Commune
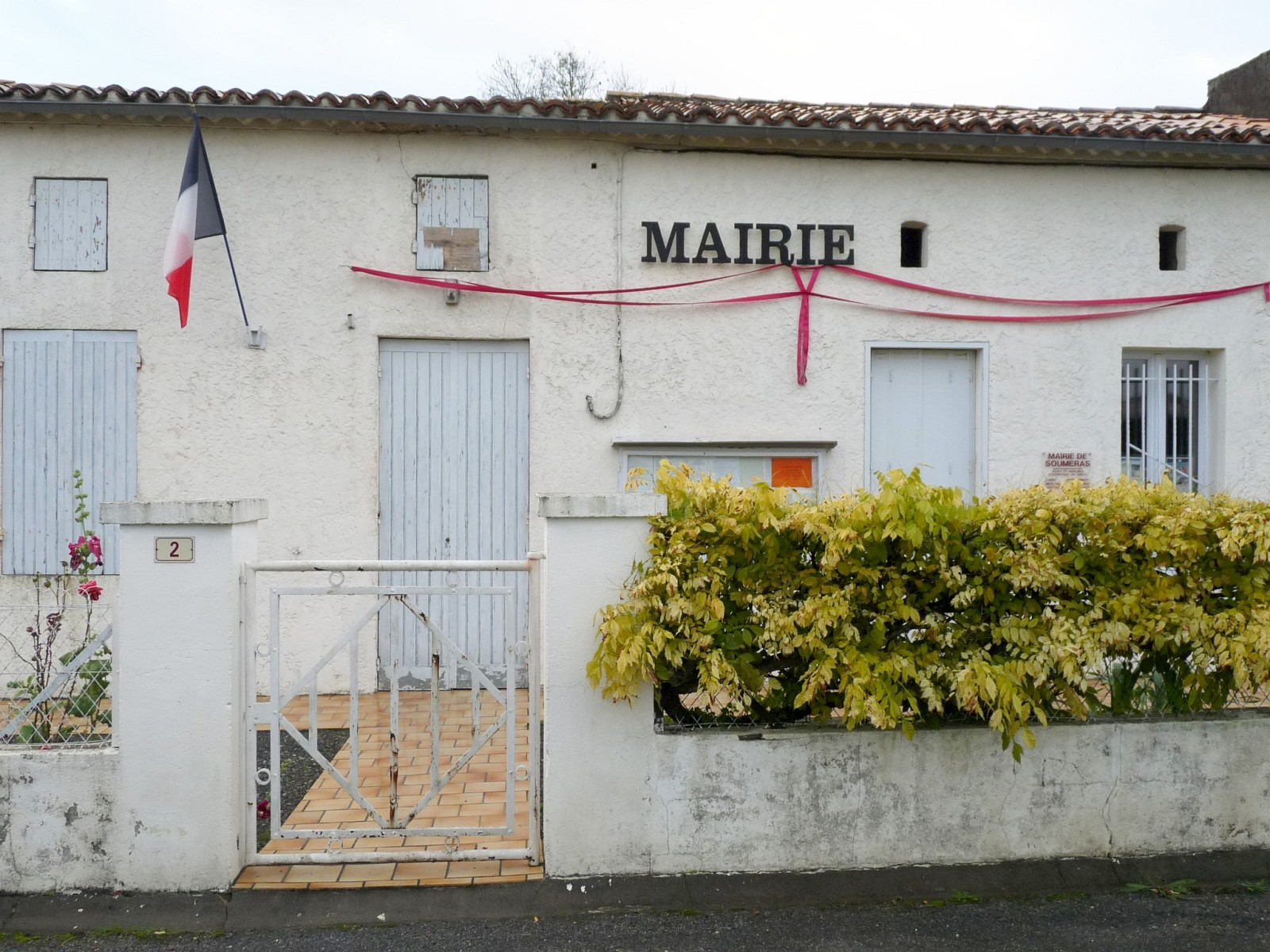
- The town hall in Souméras
- Location of Souméras
- Location within France Location within Nouvelle-Aquitaine
- Coordinates: 45°18′00″N 0°25′27″W
- Country: France
- Region: Nouvelle-Aquitaine
- Department: Charente-Maritime
- Arrondissement: Jonzac
- Canton: Les Trois Monts
- Intercommunality: Haute-Saintonge

Government
  - Mayor (2020–2026): Jacques Perennes
- Area^{1}: 6.26 km^{2} (2.42 sq mi)
- Elevation: 50 m (160 ft)
- Highest elevation: 81 m (266 ft)
- Lowest elevation: 29 m (95 ft)
- Population (2023): 381
  - Density: 60.9/km^{2} (158/sq mi)
- Time zone: UTC+01:00 (CET)
  - Summer (DST): UTC+02:00 (CEST)
- INSEE/Postal code: 17432 /17130
- ^{1} French Land Register data, which excludes lakes, ponds, glaciers > 1 km^{2} (0.386 sq mi or 247 acres) and river estuaries.

Souméras is a commune in the Charente-Maritime department in southwestern France.

== Population ==
Historical population
Year	Pop.	±% p.a.
1968	239	—
1975	238	−0.06%
1982	241	+0.18%
1990	267	+1.29%
1999	279	+0.49%
2007	327	+2.00%
2012	354	+1.60%
2017	363	+0.50%
2023	381	+0.81%
Source: INSEE

== See also ==
- Communes of the Charente-Maritime department
