= Le Pin, Charente-Maritime =

Le Pin
- Commune
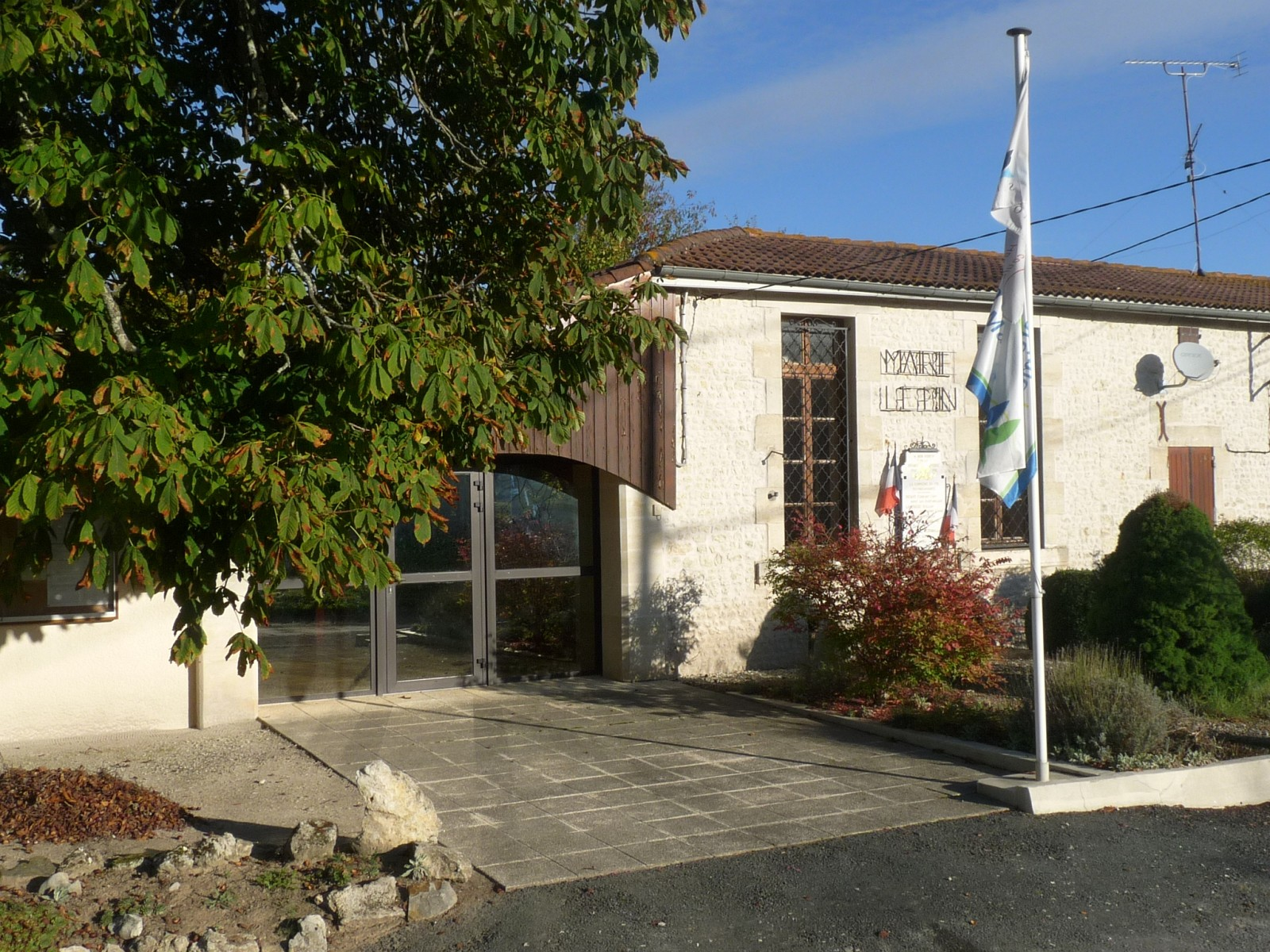
- The town hall in Le Pin
- Location of Le Pin
- Location within France Location within Nouvelle-Aquitaine
- Coordinates: 45°18′41″N 0°17′19″W
- Country: France
- Region: Nouvelle-Aquitaine
- Department: Charente-Maritime
- Arrondissement: Jonzac
- Canton: Les Trois Monts
- Intercommunality: Haute-Saintonge

Government
  - Mayor (2020–2026): Christian Salah
- Area^{1}: 2.46 km^{2} (0.95 sq mi)
- Elevation: 95 m (312 ft)
- Highest elevation: 108 m (354 ft)
- Lowest elevation: 60 m (200 ft)
- Population (2023): 71
  - Density: 29/km^{2} (75/sq mi)
- Time zone: UTC+01:00 (CET)
  - Summer (DST): UTC+02:00 (CEST)
- INSEE/Postal code: 17276 /17220
- ^{1} French Land Register data, which excludes lakes, ponds, glaciers > 1 km^{2} (0.386 sq mi or 247 acres) and river estuaries.

Le Pin (French pronunciation: [lə pɛ̃]; French meaning "the pine") is a commune in the Charente-Maritime department in the Nouvelle-Aquitaine region in southwestern France. Le Pin is the least populated commune in the canton of Les Trois Monts.

== Geography ==
The commune is traversed by the Seugne river.

== Population ==
Historical population
Year	Pop.	±% p.a.
1968	86	—
1975	82	−0.68%
1982	66	−3.05%
1990	60	−1.18%
1999	73	+2.20%
2007	72	−0.17%
2012	77	+1.35%
2017	80	+0.77%
2023	71	−1.97%
Source: INSEE

== See also ==
- Communes of the Charente-Maritime department
