= Boresse-et-Martron =

- Commune
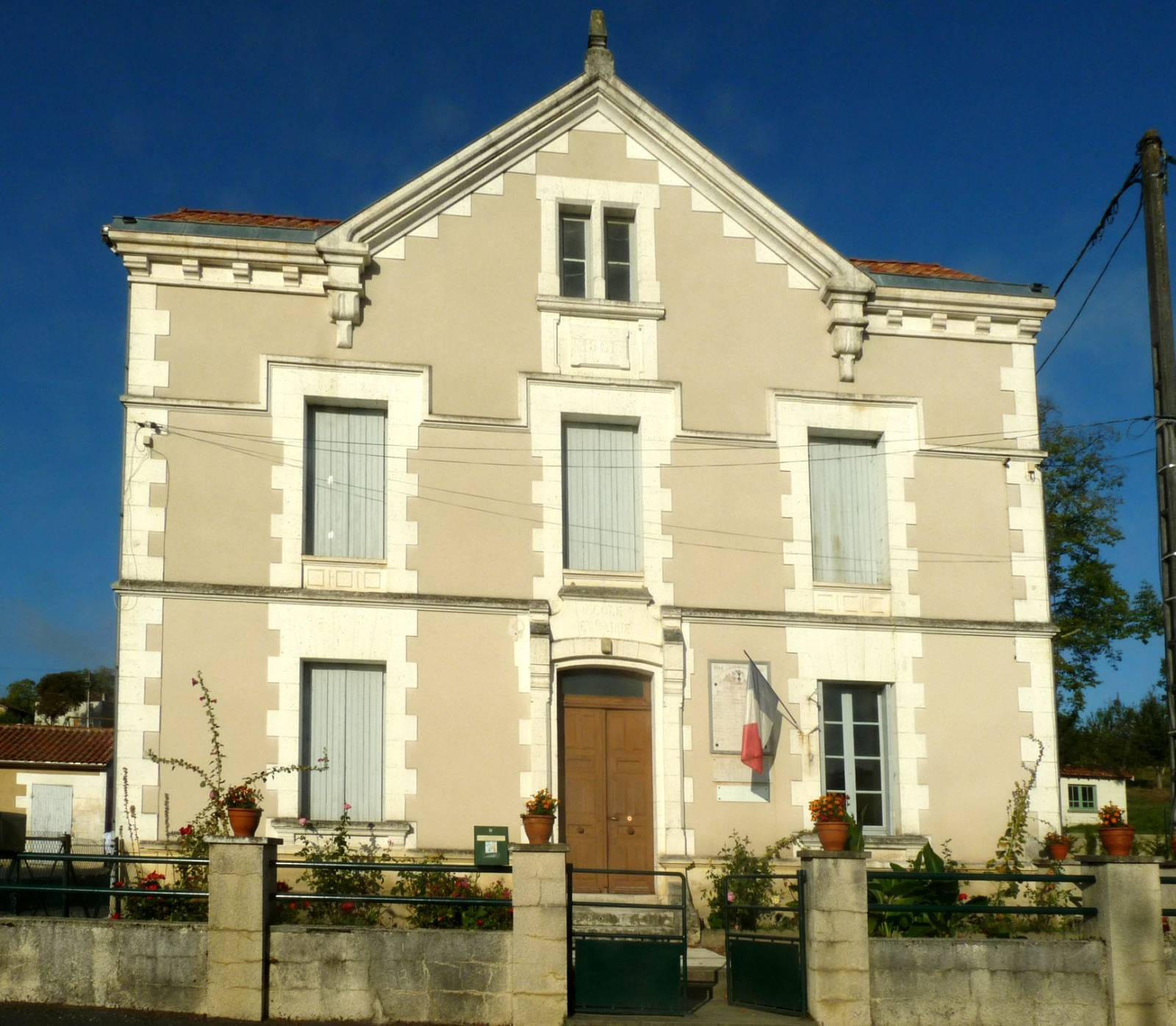
- Town hall
- Location of Boresse-et-Martron
- Location within France Location within Nouvelle-Aquitaine
- Coordinates: 45°16′23″N 0°06′46″W
- Country: France
- Region: Nouvelle-Aquitaine
- Department: Charente-Maritime
- Arrondissement: Jonzac
- Canton: Les Trois Monts
- Intercommunality: Haute-Saintonge

Government
  - Mayor (2020–2026): Michel Ollivier
- Area^{1}: 11.19 km^{2} (4.32 sq mi)
- Elevation: 55 m (180 ft)
- Highest elevation: 146 m (479 ft)
- Lowest elevation: 48 m (157 ft)
- Population (2023): 200
  - Density: 18/km^{2} (46/sq mi)
- Time zone: UTC+01:00 (CET)
  - Summer (DST): UTC+02:00 (CEST)
- INSEE/Postal code: 17054 /17270
- ^{1} French Land Register data, which excludes lakes, ponds, glaciers > 1 km^{2} (0.386 sq mi or 247 acres) and river estuaries.

Boresse-et-Martron (French pronunciation: [bɔʁɛs e maʁtʁɔ̃]) is a commune in the Charente-Maritime department in the Nouvelle-Aquitaine region in southwestern France.

== Population ==
Historical population
Year	Pop.	±% p.a.
1968	304	—
1975	255	−2.48%
1982	228	−1.59%
1990	198	−1.75%
1999	221	+1.23%
2007	182	−2.40%
2012	205	+2.41%
2017	210	+0.48%
2023	200	−0.81%
Source: INSEE

== See also ==
- Communes of the Charente-Maritime department
