= Saint-Pierre-du-Palais =

- Commune
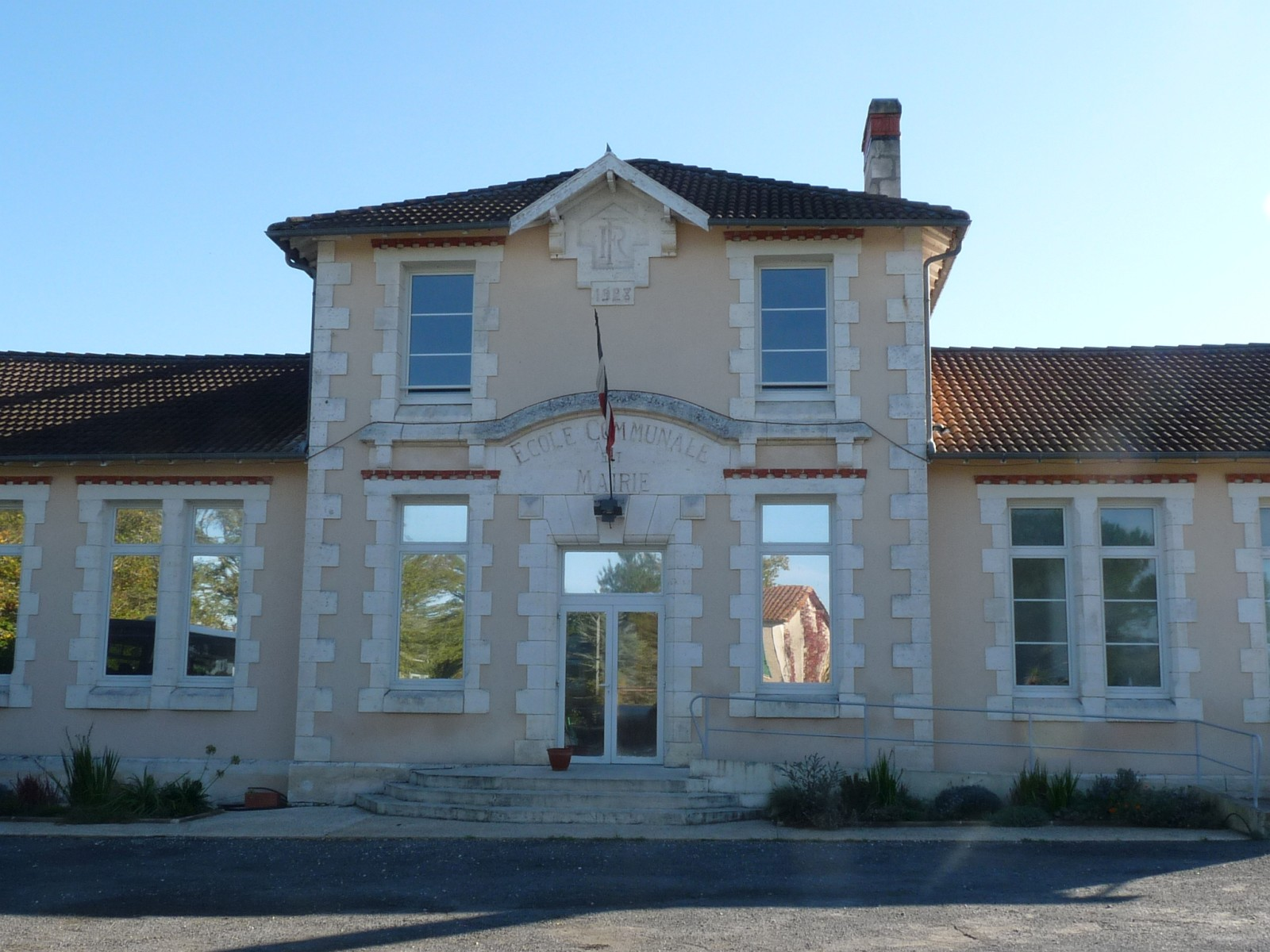
- The town hall in Saint-Pierre-du-Palais
- Location of Saint-Pierre-du-Palais
- Location within France Location within Nouvelle-Aquitaine
- Coordinates: 45°10′00″N 0°09′22″W
- Country: France
- Region: Nouvelle-Aquitaine
- Department: Charente-Maritime
- Arrondissement: Jonzac
- Canton: Les Trois Monts
- Intercommunality: Haute-Saintonge

Government
  - Mayor (2020–2026): Christian Dufour
- Area^{1}: 12.93 km^{2} (4.99 sq mi)
- Elevation: 43 m (141 ft)
- Highest elevation: 106 m (348 ft)
- Lowest elevation: 19 m (62 ft)
- Population (2023): 337
  - Density: 26.1/km^{2} (67.5/sq mi)
- Time zone: UTC+01:00 (CET)
  - Summer (DST): UTC+02:00 (CEST)
- INSEE/Postal code: 17386 /17270
- ^{1} French Land Register data, which excludes lakes, ponds, glaciers > 1 km^{2} (0.386 sq mi or 247 acres) and river estuaries.

Saint-Pierre-du-Palais (French pronunciation: [sɛ̃ pjɛʁ dy palɛ]) is a commune in the Charente-Maritime department in southwestern France.

== Population ==
Historical population
Year	Pop.	±% p.a.
1968	340	—
1975	293	−2.10%
1982	286	−0.34%
1990	260	−1.18%
1999	262	+0.09%
2007	314	+2.29%
2012	372	+3.45%
2017	366	−0.32%
2023	337	−1.37%
Source: INSEE

== See also ==
- Communes of the Charente-Maritime department
