= Le Fouilloux =

- Commune
- Location of Le Fouilloux
- Location within France Location within Nouvelle-Aquitaine
- Coordinates: 45°11′29″N 0°07′30″W
- Country: France
- Region: Nouvelle-Aquitaine
- Department: Charente-Maritime
- Arrondissement: Jonzac
- Canton: Les Trois Monts
- Intercommunality: Haute-Saintonge

Government
  - Mayor (2020–2026): Pascal Boor
- Area^{1}: 29.55 km^{2} (11.41 sq mi)
- Elevation: 100 m (330 ft)
- Highest elevation: 126 m (413 ft)
- Lowest elevation: 32 m (105 ft)
- Population (2023): 755
  - Density: 25.5/km^{2} (66.2/sq mi)
- Time zone: UTC+01:00 (CET)
  - Summer (DST): UTC+02:00 (CEST)
- INSEE/Postal code: 17167 /17270
- ^{1} French Land Register data, which excludes lakes, ponds, glaciers > 1 km^{2} (0.386 sq mi or 247 acres) and river estuaries.

Le Fouilloux (French pronunciation: [lə fuju]) is a commune in the Charente-Maritime department in southwestern France.

== Population ==
Historical population
Year	Pop.	±% p.a.
1968	925	—
1975	767	−2.64%
1982	667	−1.98%
1990	615	−1.01%
1999	628	+0.23%
2007	679	+0.98%
2012	764	+2.39%
2017	774	+0.26%
2023	755	−0.41%
Source: INSEE

== See also ==
- Communes of the Charente-Maritime department
