= Chamouillac =

- Commune
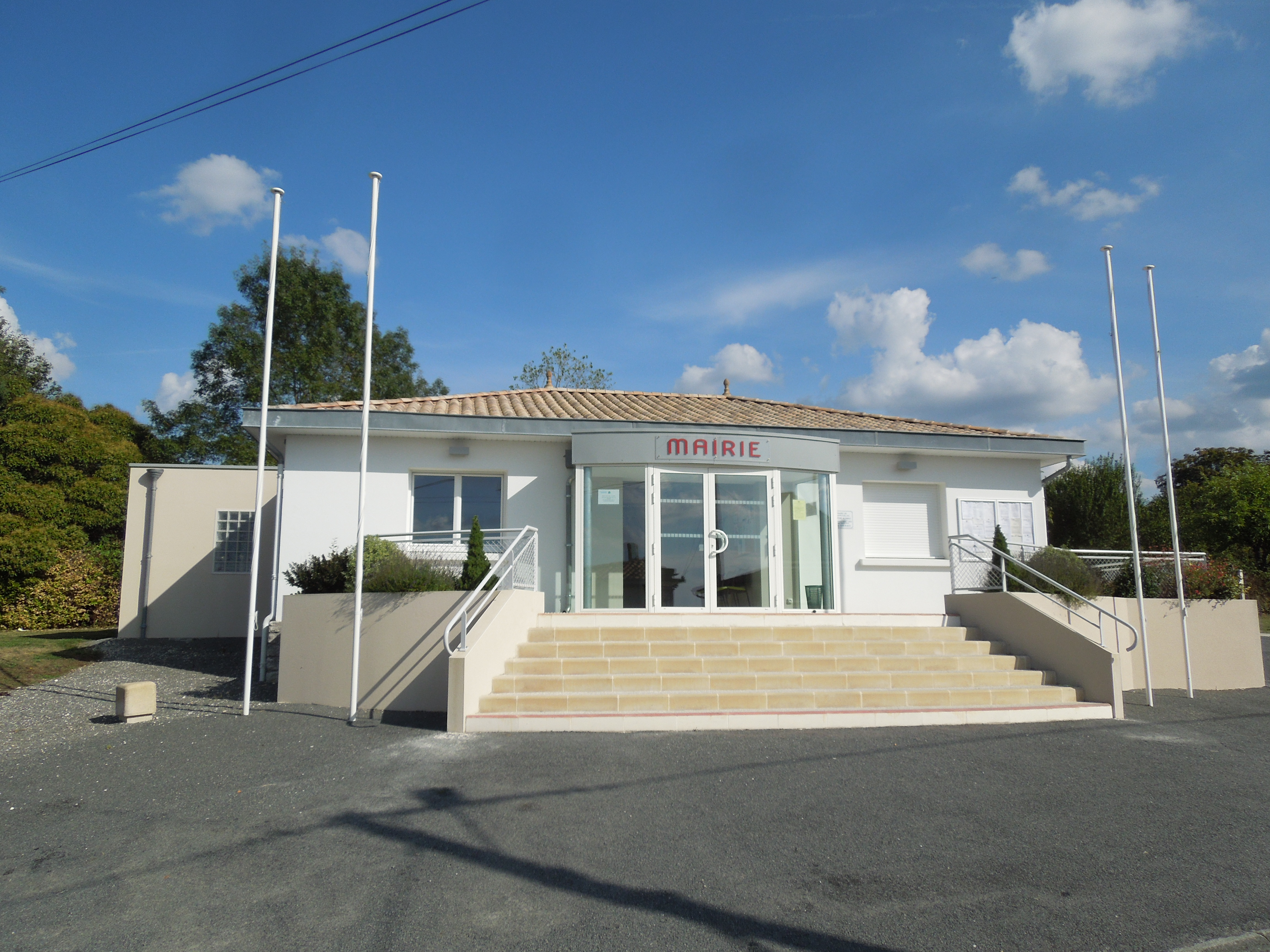
- The town hall in Chamouillac
- Location of Chamouillac
- Location within France Location within Nouvelle-Aquitaine
- Coordinates: 45°18′51″N 0°27′53″W
- Country: France
- Region: Nouvelle-Aquitaine
- Department: Charente-Maritime
- Arrondissement: Jonzac
- Canton: Les Trois Monts
- Intercommunality: Haute-Saintonge

Government
  - Mayor (2020–2026): Serge Jourdain
- Area^{1}: 8.19 km^{2} (3.16 sq mi)
- Elevation: 60 m (200 ft)
- Highest elevation: 87 m (285 ft)
- Lowest elevation: 23 m (75 ft)
- Population (2023): 370
  - Density: 45/km^{2} (120/sq mi)
- Time zone: UTC+01:00 (CET)
  - Summer (DST): UTC+02:00 (CEST)
- INSEE/Postal code: 17081 /17130
- ^{1} French Land Register data, which excludes lakes, ponds, glaciers > 1 km^{2} (0.386 sq mi or 247 acres) and river estuaries.

Chamouillac (French pronunciation: [ʃamujak]) is a commune in the Charente-Maritime department in southwestern France.

== Population ==
Historical population
Year	Pop.	±% p.a.
1968	338	—
1975	288	−2.26%
1982	303	+0.73%
1990	316	+0.53%
1999	322	+0.21%
2007	315	−0.27%
2012	355	+2.42%
2017	374	+1.05%
2023	370	−0.18%
Source: INSEE

== See also ==
- Communes of the Charente-Maritime department
