= Corignac =

- Commune
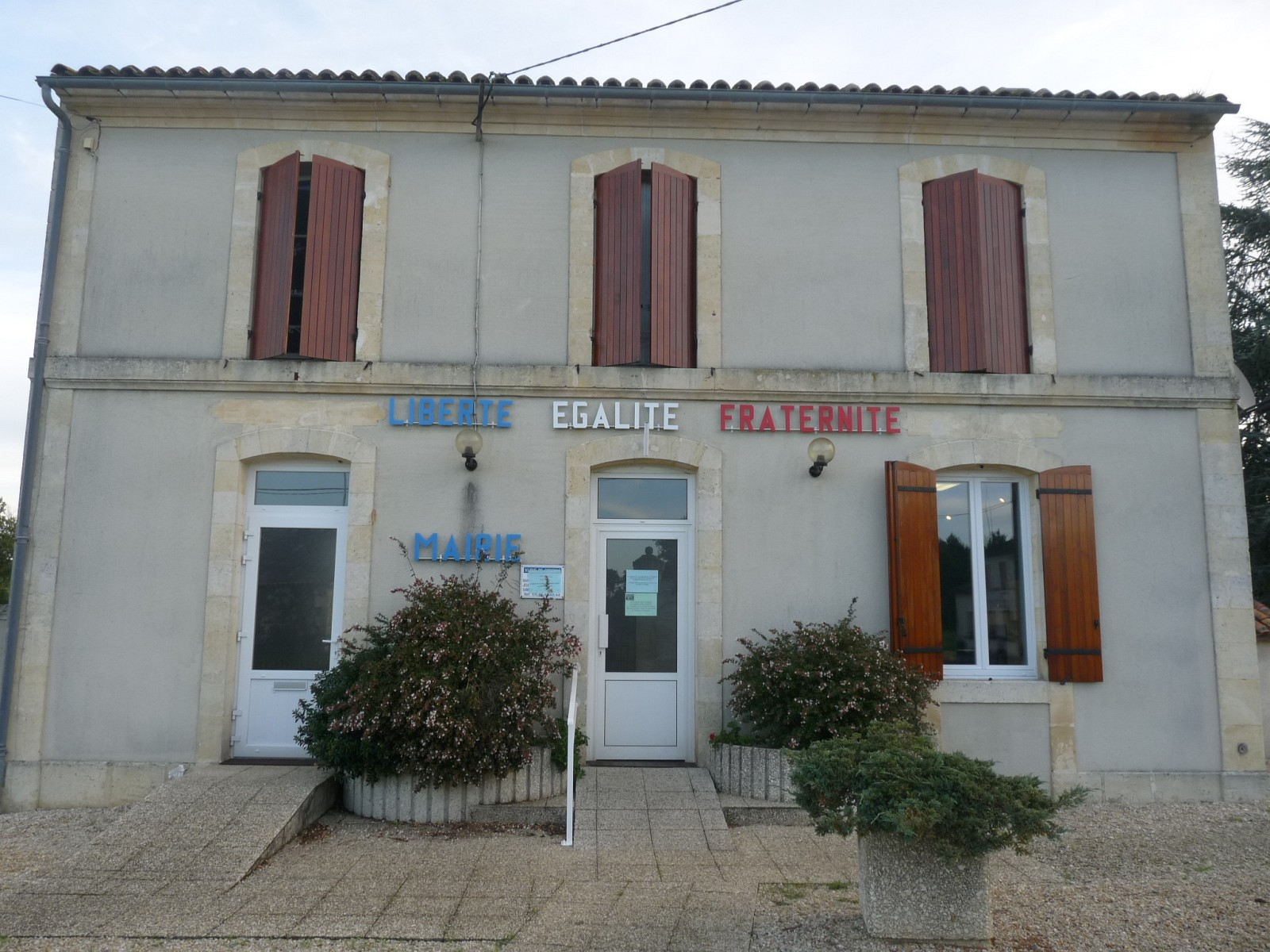
- The town hall in Corignac
- Location of Corignac
- Location within France Location within Nouvelle-Aquitaine
- Coordinates: 45°14′57″N 0°23′24″W
- Country: France
- Region: Nouvelle-Aquitaine
- Department: Charente-Maritime
- Arrondissement: Jonzac
- Canton: Les Trois Monts
- Intercommunality: Haute-Saintonge

Government
  - Mayor (2020–2026): Karine Lhermite
- Area^{1}: 11.57 km^{2} (4.47 sq mi)
- Elevation: 63 m (207 ft)
- Highest elevation: 98 m (322 ft)
- Lowest elevation: 43 m (141 ft)
- Population (2023): 326
  - Density: 28.2/km^{2} (73.0/sq mi)
- Time zone: UTC+01:00 (CET)
  - Summer (DST): UTC+02:00 (CEST)
- INSEE/Postal code: 17118 /17130
- ^{1} French Land Register data, which excludes lakes, ponds, glaciers > 1 km^{2} (0.386 sq mi or 247 acres) and river estuaries.

Corignac (French pronunciation: [kɔʁiɲak]) is a commune in the Charente-Maritime department in southwestern France.

== Population ==
Historical population
Year	Pop.	±% p.a.
1968	190	—
1975	179	−0.85%
1982	211	+2.38%
1990	230	+1.08%
1999	260	+1.37%
2007	329	+2.99%
2012	357	+1.65%
2017	360	+0.17%
2023	326	−1.64%
Source: INSEE

== See also ==
- Communes of the Charente-Maritime department
