= La Clotte =

- Commune
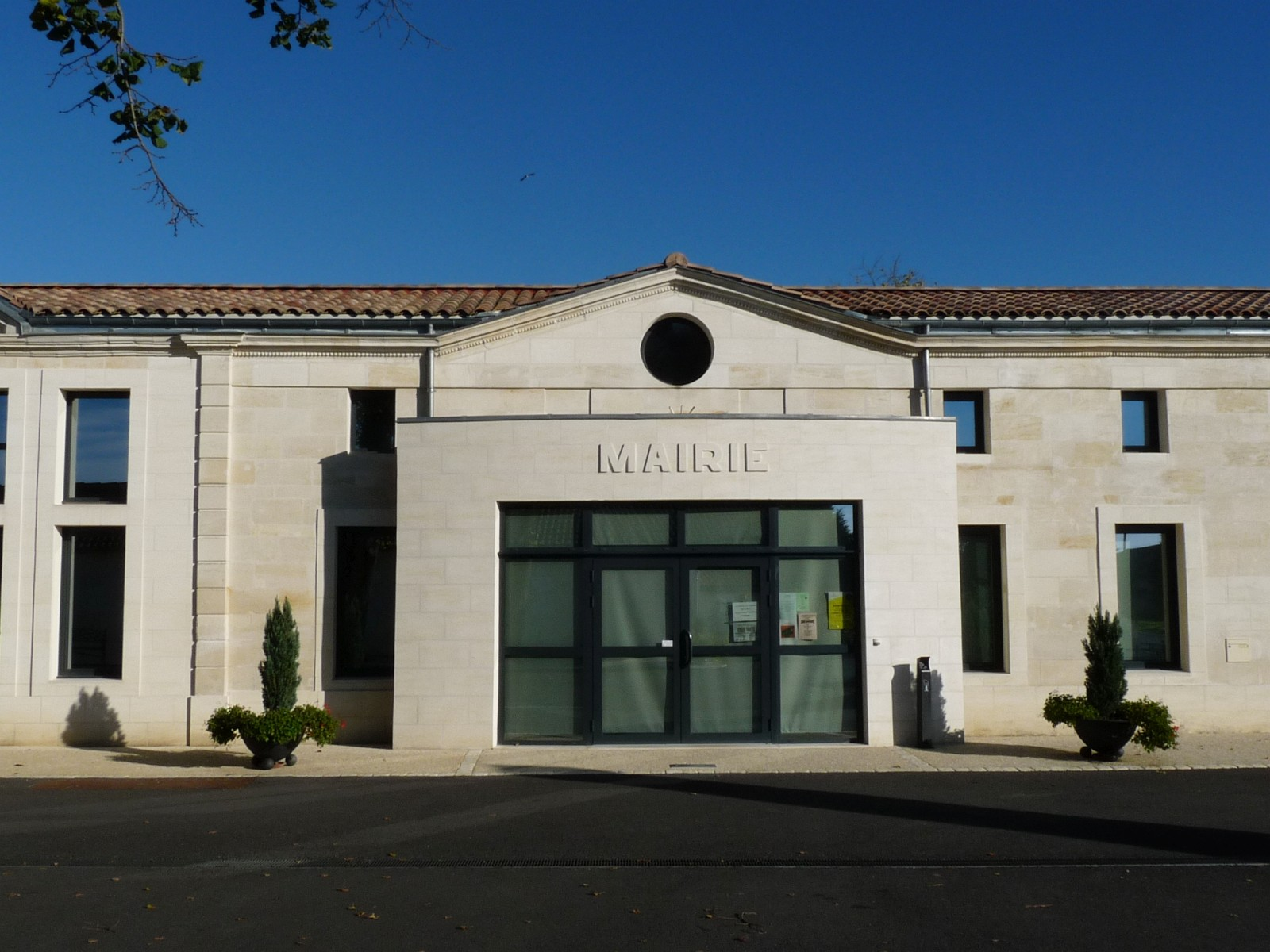
- The town hall in La Clotte

- Coat of arms
- Location of La Clotte
- Location within France Location within Nouvelle-Aquitaine
- Coordinates: 45°07′07″N 0°08′49″W
- Country: France
- Region: Nouvelle-Aquitaine
- Department: Charente-Maritime
- Arrondissement: Jonzac
- Canton: Les Trois Monts
- Intercommunality: Haute-Saintonge

Government
  - Mayor (2020–2026): Jean-Luc Delut
- Area^{1}: 17.84 km^{2} (6.89 sq mi)
- Elevation: 39 m (128 ft)
- Highest elevation: 73 m (240 ft)
- Lowest elevation: 12 m (39 ft)
- Population (2023): 708
  - Density: 39.7/km^{2} (103/sq mi)
- Time zone: UTC+01:00 (CET)
  - Summer (DST): UTC+02:00 (CEST)
- INSEE/Postal code: 17113 /17360
- ^{1} French Land Register data, which excludes lakes, ponds, glaciers > 1 km^{2} (0.386 sq mi or 247 acres) and river estuaries.

La Clotte (French pronunciation: [la klɔt]) is a commune in the Charente-Maritime department in southwestern France.

== Population ==
Historical population
Year	Pop.	±% p.a.
1968	484	—
1975	499	+0.44%
1982	475	−0.70%
1990	475	+0.00%
1999	490	+0.35%
2007	573	+1.98%
2012	698	+4.03%
2017	708	+0.28%
2023	708	+0.00%
Source: INSEE

== See also ==
- Communes of the Charente-Maritime department
