= Jussas =

- Commune
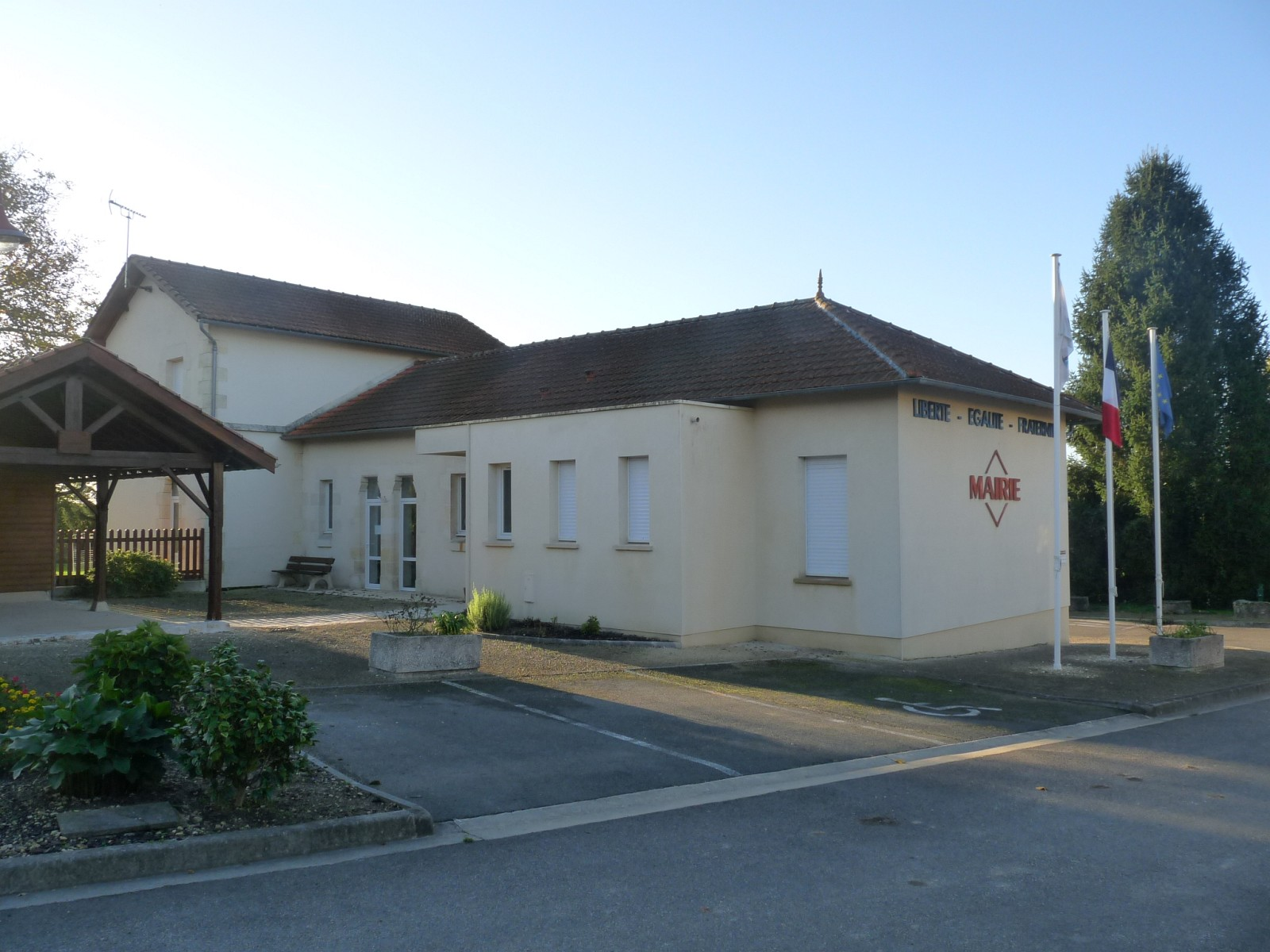
- The town hall in Jussas
- Location of Jussas
- Location within France Location within Nouvelle-Aquitaine
- Coordinates: 45°17′03″N 0°20′34″W
- Country: France
- Region: Nouvelle-Aquitaine
- Department: Charente-Maritime
- Arrondissement: Jonzac
- Canton: Les Trois Monts
- Intercommunality: Haute-Saintonge

Government
  - Mayor (2020–2026): Jean-François Coué
- Area^{1}: 9.11 km^{2} (3.52 sq mi)
- Elevation: 102 m (335 ft)
- Highest elevation: 125 m (410 ft)
- Lowest elevation: 64 m (210 ft)
- Population (2023): 155
  - Density: 17.0/km^{2} (44.1/sq mi)
- Time zone: UTC+01:00 (CET)
  - Summer (DST): UTC+02:00 (CEST)
- INSEE/Postal code: 17199 /17130
- ^{1} French Land Register data, which excludes lakes, ponds, glaciers > 1 km^{2} (0.386 sq mi or 247 acres) and river estuaries.

Jussas is a commune in the Charente-Maritime department in southwestern France.

== Population ==
Historical population
Year	Pop.	±% p.a.
1968	107	—
1975	120	+1.65%
1982	123	+0.35%
1990	96	−3.05%
1999	104	+0.89%
2007	101	−0.37%
2012	123	+4.02%
2017	150	+4.05%
2023	155	+0.55%
Source: INSEE

== See also ==
- Communes of the Charente-Maritime department
