= Expiremont =

- Commune
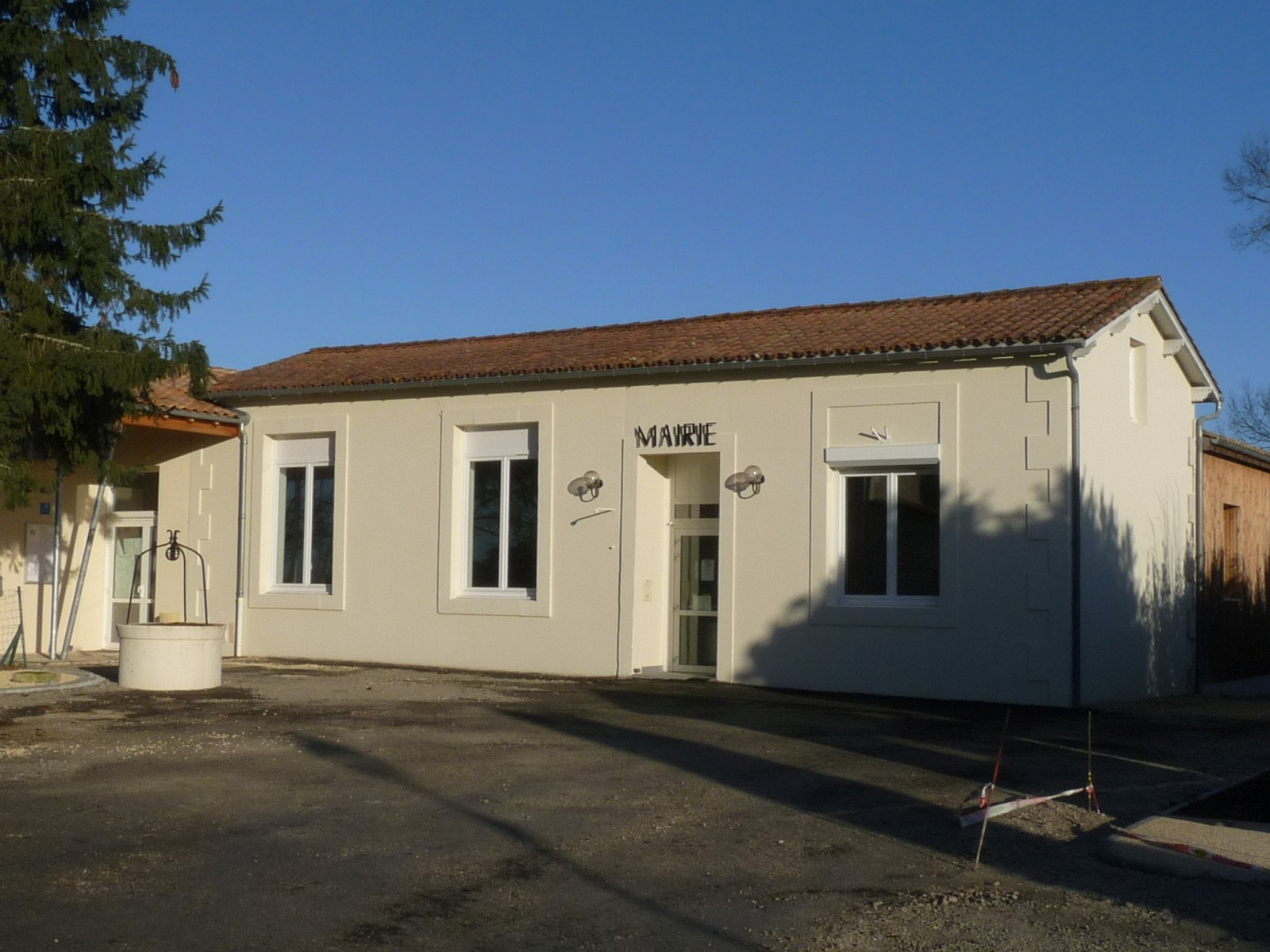
- The town hall in Expiremont
- Location of Expiremont
- Location within France Location within Nouvelle-Aquitaine
- Coordinates: 45°19′30″N 0°22′15″W
- Country: France
- Region: Nouvelle-Aquitaine
- Department: Charente-Maritime
- Arrondissement: Jonzac
- Canton: Les Trois Monts
- Intercommunality: Haute-Saintonge

Government
  - Mayor (2020–2026): Bruno Faure
- Area^{1}: 5.66 km^{2} (2.19 sq mi)
- Elevation: 100 m (330 ft)
- Highest elevation: 116 m (381 ft)
- Lowest elevation: 51 m (167 ft)
- Population (2023): 112
  - Density: 19.8/km^{2} (51.3/sq mi)
- Time zone: UTC+01:00 (CET)
  - Summer (DST): UTC+02:00 (CEST)
- INSEE/Postal code: 17156 /17130
- ^{1} French Land Register data, which excludes lakes, ponds, glaciers > 1 km^{2} (0.386 sq mi or 247 acres) and river estuaries.

Expiremont (French pronunciation: [ɛkspiʁmɔ̃]) is a commune in the Charente-Maritime department in southwestern France.

== Population ==
Historical population
Year	Pop.	±% p.a.
1968	122	—
1975	99	−2.94%
1982	104	+0.71%
1990	87	−2.21%
1999	105	+2.11%
2007	117	+1.36%
2012	130	+2.13%
2017	127	−0.47%
2023	112	−2.07%
Source: INSEE

== See also ==
- Communes of the Charente-Maritime department
