= La Barde =

- Commune
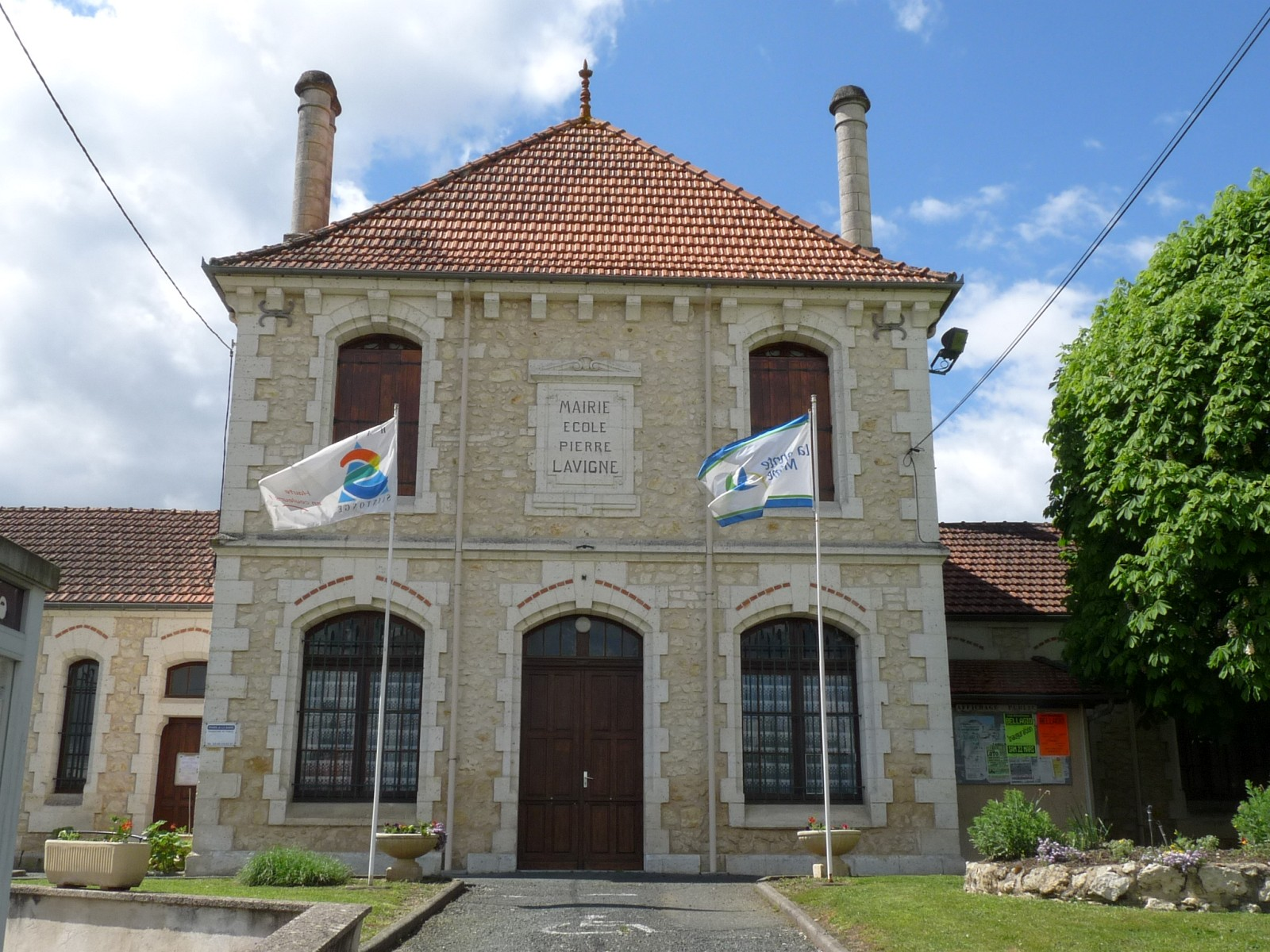
- The town hall in La Barde
- Location of La Barde
- Location within France Location within Nouvelle-Aquitaine
- Coordinates: 45°07′28″N 0°02′20″W
- Country: France
- Region: Nouvelle-Aquitaine
- Department: Charente-Maritime
- Arrondissement: Jonzac
- Canton: Les Trois Monts
- Intercommunality: Haute-Saintonge

Government
  - Mayor (2020–2026): Jean-Pascal Cartron
- Area^{1}: 21.25 km^{2} (8.20 sq mi)
- Elevation: 34 m (112 ft)
- Highest elevation: 96 m (315 ft)
- Lowest elevation: 11 m (36 ft)
- Population (2023): 504
  - Density: 23.7/km^{2} (61.4/sq mi)
- Time zone: UTC+01:00 (CET)
  - Summer (DST): UTC+02:00 (CEST)
- INSEE/Postal code: 17033 /17360
- ^{1} French Land Register data, which excludes lakes, ponds, glaciers > 1 km^{2} (0.386 sq mi or 247 acres) and river estuaries.

La Barde (French pronunciation: [la baʁd]) is a commune in the Charente-Maritime department in the Nouvelle-Aquitaine region in southwestern France.

== Population ==
Historical population
Year	Pop.	±% p.a.
1968	406	—
1975	413	+0.24%
1982	372	−1.48%
1990	377	+0.17%
1999	360	−0.51%
2007	419	+1.92%
2012	452	+1.53%
2017	497	+1.92%
2023	504	+0.23%
Source: INSEE

== See also ==
- Communes of the Charente-Maritime department
