= James Germain Février =

French historian and philologist

James Germain Février (January 1895, in Clérac – 15 July 1976, in Paris) was a 20th-century French historian and philologist. A specialist of the Semitic world, his thesis was on the archaeological site of Palmyra and he wrote numerous studies on the history of Carthage and the Phoenicians.

He was editor-in-chief of the Journal Asiatique from 1967 to 1972.
