= Saint-Martin-de-Coux =

- Commune
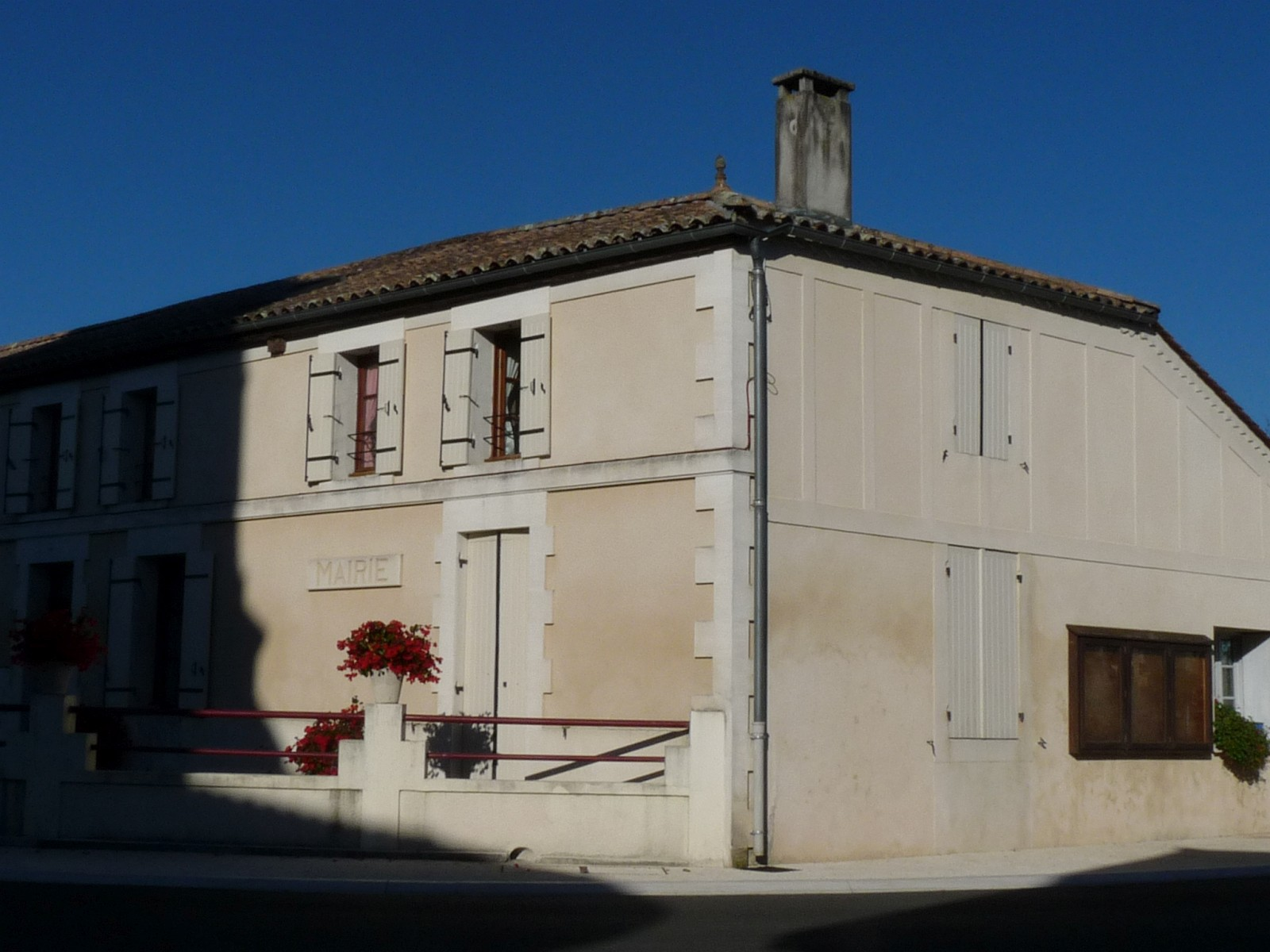
- The town hall in Saint-Martin-de-Coux

- Coat of arms
- Location of Saint-Martin-de-Coux
- Location within France Location within Nouvelle-Aquitaine
- Coordinates: 45°08′46″N 0°06′29″W
- Country: France
- Region: Nouvelle-Aquitaine
- Department: Charente-Maritime
- Arrondissement: Jonzac
- Canton: Les Trois Monts
- Intercommunality: Haute-Saintonge

Government
  - Mayor (2020–2026): Alain Feuillet
- Area^{1}: 15.71 km^{2} (6.07 sq mi)
- Elevation: 80 m (260 ft)
- Highest elevation: 111 m (364 ft)
- Lowest elevation: 30 m (98 ft)
- Population (2023): 444
  - Density: 28.3/km^{2} (73.2/sq mi)
- Time zone: UTC+01:00 (CET)
  - Summer (DST): UTC+02:00 (CEST)
- INSEE/Postal code: 17366 /17360
- ^{1} French Land Register data, which excludes lakes, ponds, glaciers > 1 km^{2} (0.386 sq mi or 247 acres) and river estuaries.

Saint-Martin-de-Coux (French pronunciation: [sɛ̃ maʁtɛ̃ də ku]) is a commune in the Charente-Maritime department in southwestern France.

== Population ==
Historical population
Year	Pop.	±% p.a.
1968	504	—
1975	444	−1.79%
1982	423	−0.69%
1990	398	−0.76%
1999	347	−1.51%
2007	396	+1.66%
2012	435	+1.90%
2017	461	+1.17%
2023	444	−0.62%
Source: INSEE

== See also ==
- Communes of the Charente-Maritime department
