= Saint-Aigulin =

- Commune
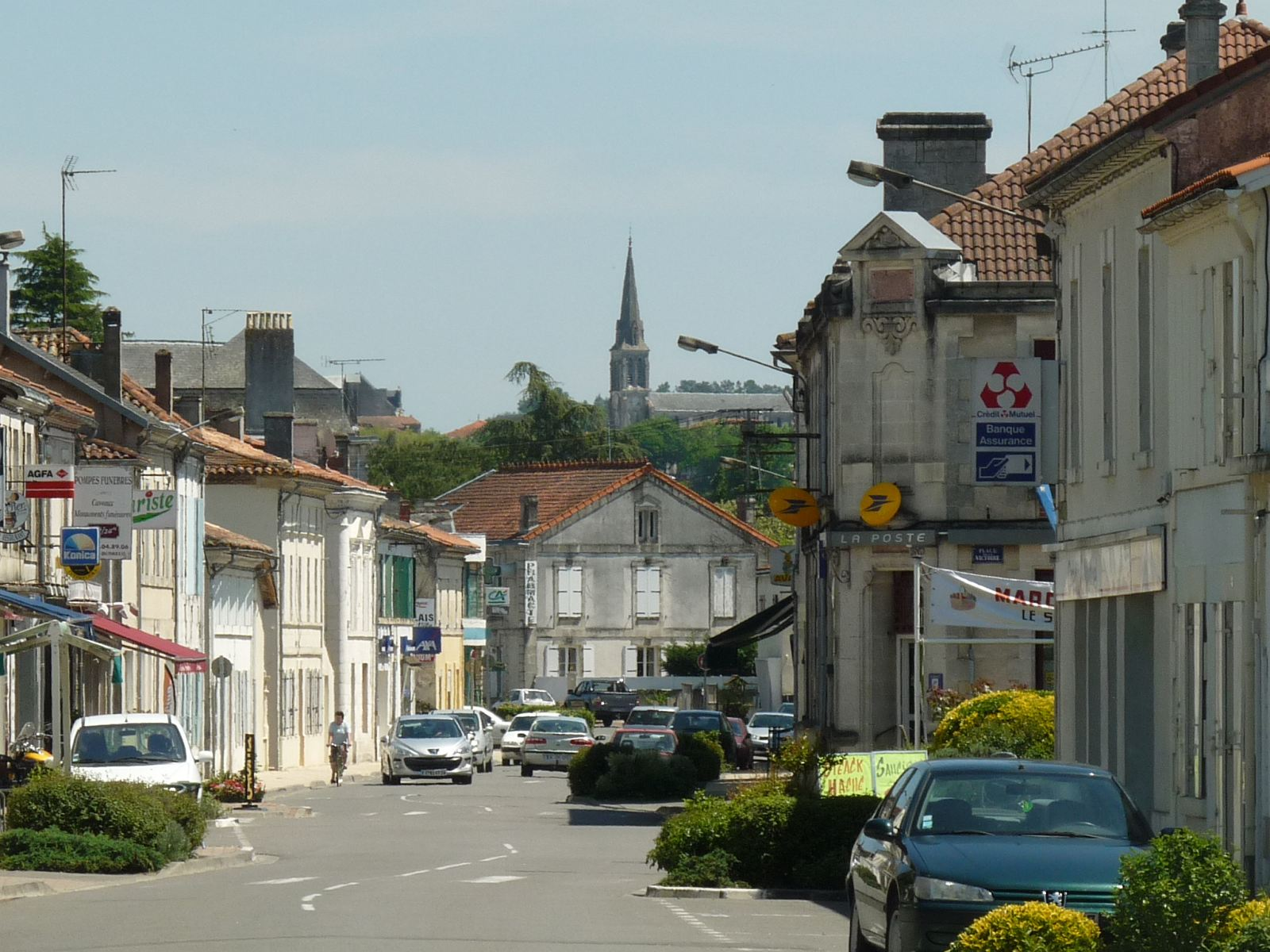
- The main road in Saint-Aigulin

- Coat of arms
- Location of Saint-Aigulin
- Location within France Location within Nouvelle-Aquitaine
- Coordinates: 45°09′27″N 0°00′32″W
- Country: France
- Region: Nouvelle-Aquitaine
- Department: Charente-Maritime
- Arrondissement: Jonzac
- Canton: Les Trois Monts
- Intercommunality: Haute-Saintonge

Government
  - Mayor (2020–2026): Brigitte Quantin
- Area^{1}: 28.36 km^{2} (10.95 sq mi)
- Elevation: 31 m (102 ft)
- Highest elevation: 116 m (381 ft)
- Lowest elevation: 15 m (49 ft)
- Population (2023): 1,878
  - Density: 66.22/km^{2} (171.5/sq mi)
- Time zone: UTC+01:00 (CET)
  - Summer (DST): UTC+02:00 (CEST)
- INSEE/Postal code: 17309 /17360
- ^{1} French Land Register data, which excludes lakes, ponds, glaciers > 1 km^{2} (0.386 sq mi or 247 acres) and river estuaries.

Saint-Aigulin (French pronunciation: [sɛ̃.t‿ɛɡylɛ̃]) is a commune in the Charente-Maritime department in southwestern France.

== Population ==
Historical population
Year	Pop.	±% p.a.
1968	2,343	—
1975	2,359	+0.10%
1982	2,220	−0.86%
1990	2,040	−1.05%
1999	1,985	−0.30%
2007	1,935	−0.32%
2012	1,903	−0.33%
2017	1,911	+0.08%
2023	1,878	−0.29%
Source: INSEE

== See also ==
- Communes of the Charente-Maritime department
