= Chevanceaux =

- Commune
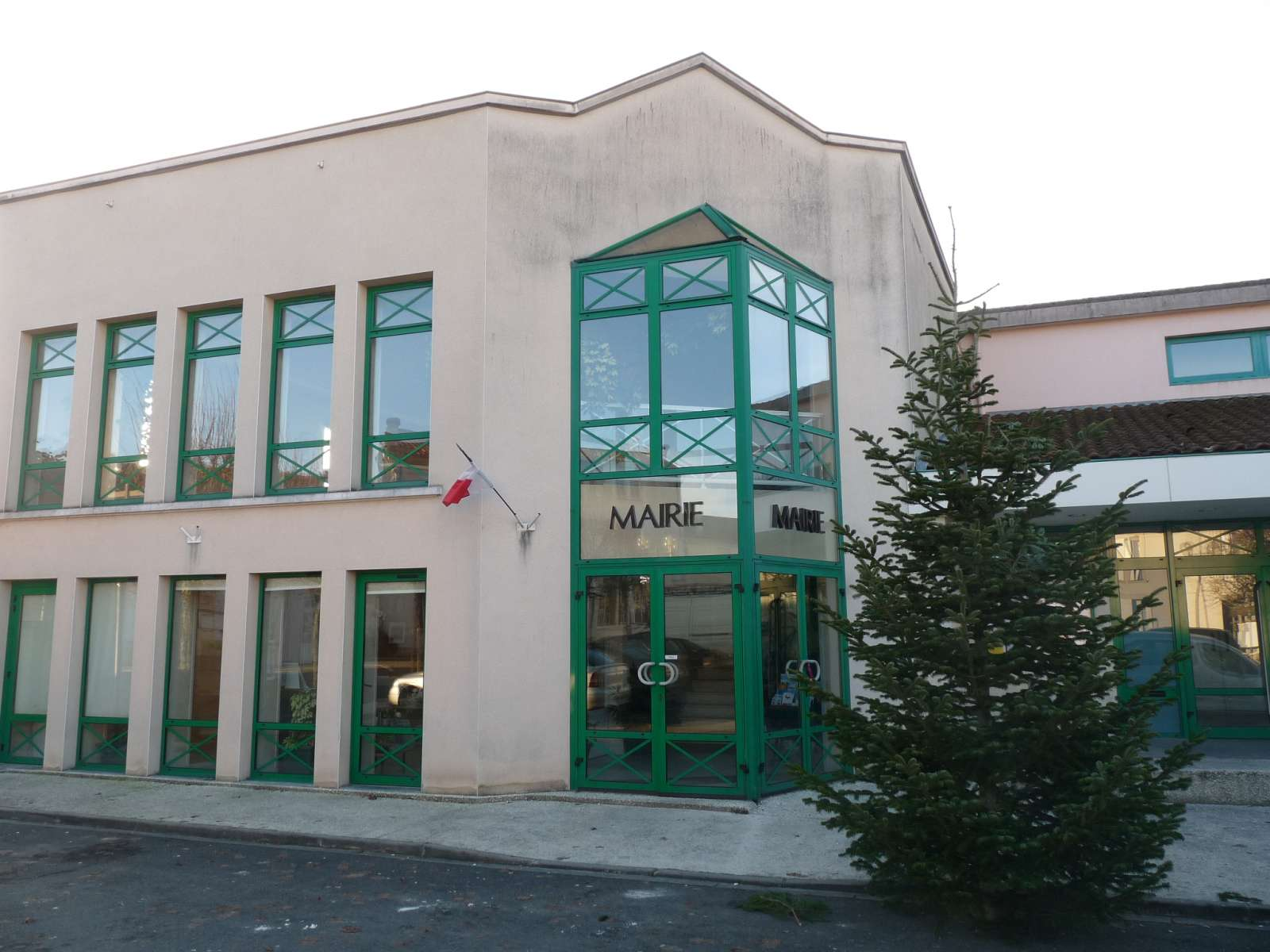
- Town hall
- Location of Chevanceaux
- Location within France Location within Nouvelle-Aquitaine
- Coordinates: 45°18′15″N 0°13′58″W
- Country: France
- Region: Nouvelle-Aquitaine
- Department: Charente-Maritime
- Arrondissement: Jonzac
- Canton: Les Trois Monts
- Intercommunality: Haute-Saintonge

Government
  - Mayor (2020–2026): Emmanuel Festal
- Area^{1}: 21.77 km^{2} (8.41 sq mi)
- Elevation: 127 m (417 ft)
- Highest elevation: 154 m (505 ft)
- Lowest elevation: 63 m (207 ft)
- Population (2023): 1,065
  - Density: 48.92/km^{2} (126.7/sq mi)
- Time zone: UTC+01:00 (CET)
  - Summer (DST): UTC+02:00 (CEST)
- INSEE/Postal code: 17104 /17220
- ^{1} French Land Register data, which excludes lakes, ponds, glaciers > 1 km^{2} (0.386 sq mi or 247 acres) and river estuaries.

Chevanceaux (French pronunciation: [ʃəvɑ̃so]) is a commune in the Charente-Maritime department in the Nouvelle-Aquitaine region in southwestern France.

== Population ==
Historical population
Year	Pop.	±% p.a.
1968	1,044	—
1975	1,129	+1.12%
1982	1,087	−0.54%
1990	1,008	−0.94%
1999	981	−0.30%
2007	1,019	+0.48%
2012	997	−0.44%
2017	1,044	+0.93%
2023	1,065	+0.33%
Source: INSEE

== See also ==
- Communes of the Charente-Maritime department
