= Coux, Charente-Maritime =

Coux
- Commune
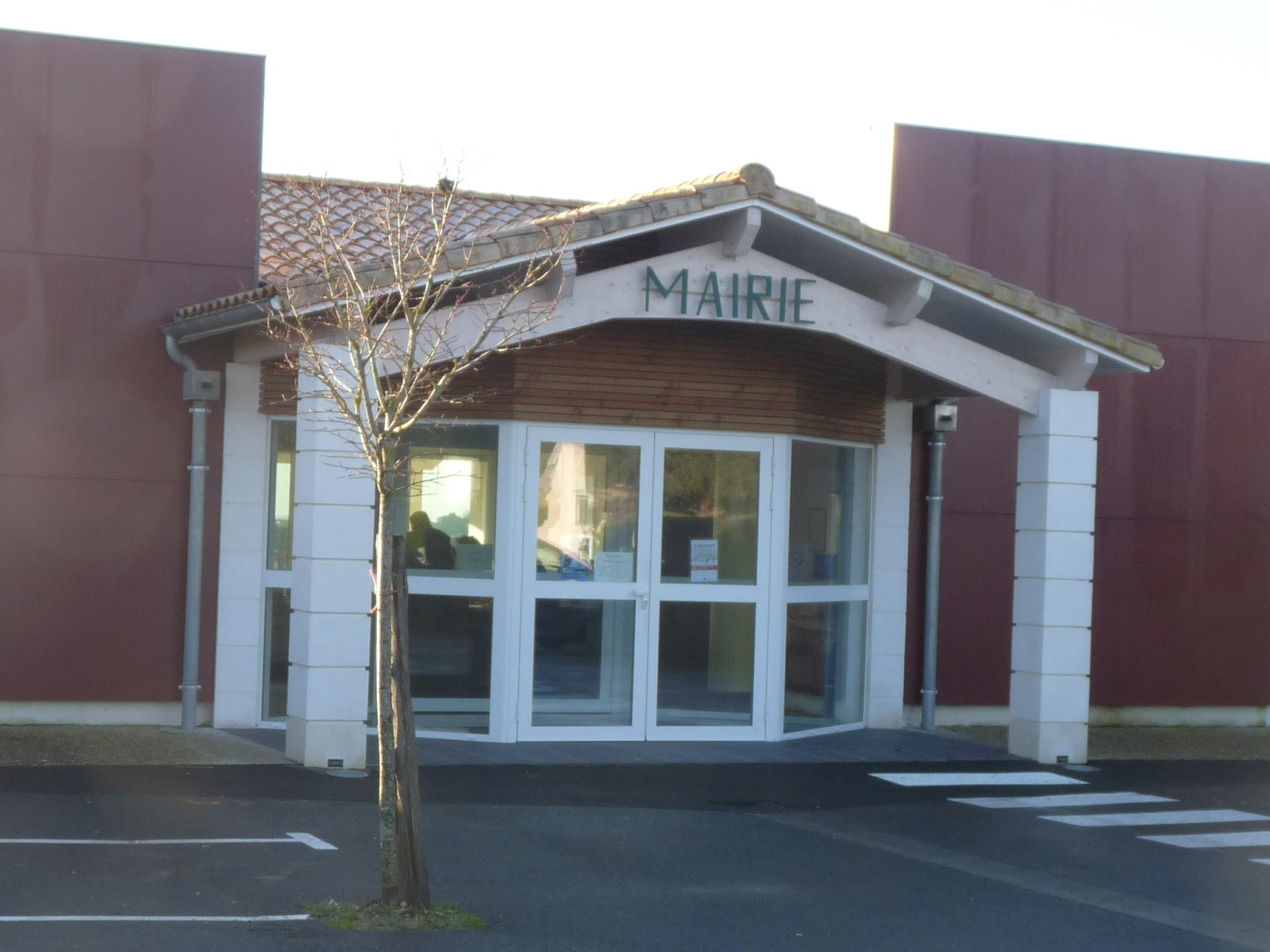
- The town hall in Coux
- Location of Coux
- Location within France Location within Nouvelle-Aquitaine
- Coordinates: 45°18′50″N 0°24′14″W
- Country: France
- Region: Nouvelle-Aquitaine
- Department: Charente-Maritime
- Arrondissement: Jonzac
- Canton: Les Trois Monts
- Intercommunality: Haute-Saintonge

Government
  - Mayor (2020–2026): Joël Carré
- Area^{1}: 13.21 km^{2} (5.10 sq mi)
- Elevation: 99 m (325 ft)
- Highest elevation: 111 m (364 ft)
- Lowest elevation: 44 m (144 ft)
- Population (2023): 480
  - Density: 36/km^{2} (94/sq mi)
- Time zone: UTC+01:00 (CET)
  - Summer (DST): UTC+02:00 (CEST)
- INSEE/Postal code: 17130 /17130
- ^{1} French Land Register data, which excludes lakes, ponds, glaciers > 1 km^{2} (0.386 sq mi or 247 acres) and river estuaries.

Coux (French pronunciation: [ku]) is a commune in the Charente-Maritime department in southwestern France.

== Population ==
Historical population
Year	Pop.	±% p.a.
1968	494	—
1975	405	−2.80%
1982	400	−0.18%
1990	400	+0.00%
1999	403	+0.08%
2007	444	+1.22%
2012	475	+1.36%
2017	456	−0.81%
2023	480	+0.86%
Source: INSEE

== See also ==
- Communes of the Charente-Maritime department
