= Achille Messac =

- Born: Haiti
- Education: Massachusetts Institute of Technology
- Scientific career
- Workplaces: Howard University; Mississippi State University; Syracuse University; Northeastern University

Achille Messac is the Dean of the College of Engineering, Architecture and Computer Sciences at Howard University. He has previously served as Professor of Aerospace Engineering Mississippi State University. He was elected a Fellow of the American Association for the Advancement of Science in 2019.

== Early life and education ==
Messac grew up in Haiti. He lived in Port-au-Prince until he was fifteen years old. He was a member of the Hughes Aircraft Company High Achiever Student program, where he worked on the Venus Orbiting Imaging Radar system. He earned his undergraduate and graduate degrees at Massachusetts Institute of Technology. He completed his doctoral studies in the Department of Aeronautical and Astronautical Engineering in 1986. After earning his PhD Messac joined the Draper Laboratory where he worked on multibody dynamics and structural optimisation. He was a pioneer in control structure integrated design and computational visualisation. He joined the faculty at Northeastern University in 1994.

== Research and career ==
Messac joined Rensselaer Polytechnic Institute in 2000. In 2008 Messac was made Head of the Mechanical, Aerospace, and Nuclear Engineering Department at Rensselaer. He moved to Syracuse University in 2010, where he was made Distinguished Professor and Chair of Mechanical and Aerospace Engineering. Alongside transforming diversity within the department, Messac helped to raise Syracuse twelve positions in the U.S. News & World Report Best Global University Ranking. In 2010 Messac returned to Haiti after the 2010 Haiti earthquake where he met Nannette Canniff, founder of the St Boniface Haiti Foundation (SBHF).

In 2013 he joined Mississippi State University, where he held the Earnest W. and Mary Ann Deavenport, Jr., Chair and Dean of Engineering. He was the first African-American person to be made a Dean at Mississippi State in the university's history. In 2015 Messac was made Director of the American Institute of Aeronautics and Astronautics, where he led nine technical committees. Messac moved to Howard University Dean of the College of Engineering, Architecture and Computer Sciences at Howard University in 2016. During his time as Dean he led the re-accreditation of the architecture program and improving the national ranking of Howard University programs. In the three years since he was elected Dean, Howard University has risen 66 positions in the U.S. News & World Report Best Global University Rankings. He partnered with Carnegie Mellon University to create a dual-degree program for postgraduate students.

=== Awards and honours ===
His awards and honours include;

- 2008 Elected Fellow of the American Institute of Aeronautics and Astronautics
- Elected Fellow of the American Society of Mechanical Engineers
- 2010 American Institute of Aeronautics and Astronautics Multidisciplinary Design Optimization Award
- 2019 Elected Fellow of the American Association for the Advancement of Science

=== Selected publications ===
His publications include;

- Messac, Achille (2018). Optimization in Practice with MATLAB®. Cambridge University Press. doi:10.1017/CBO9781316271391. ISBN 9781316271391.
- Messac, Achille (2003). "The normalized normal constraint method for generating the Pareto frontier". Structural and Multidisciplinary Optimization. 25 (2): 86–98. doi:10.1007/s00158-002-0276-1. S2CID 58945431.
- Messac, Achille (1996). "Physical programming - Effective optimization for computational design". American Institute of Aeronautics and Astronautics Journal. 34 (1): 149–158. Bibcode:1996AIAAJ..34..149M. doi:10.2514/3.13035.
