= Neuvicq =

- Commune
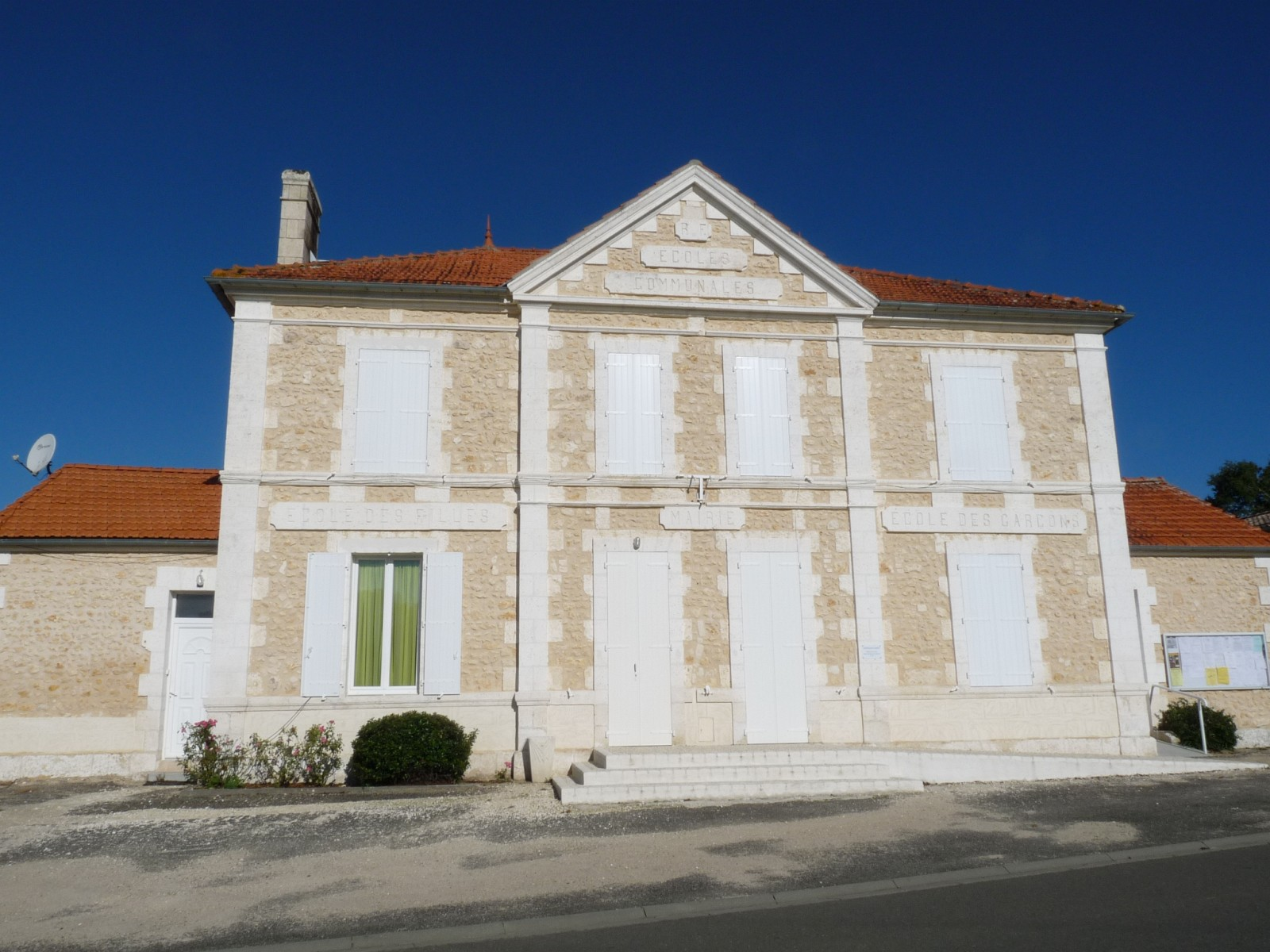
- The town hall in Neuvicq
- Location of Neuvicq
- Location within France Location within Nouvelle-Aquitaine
- Coordinates: 45°14′42″N 0°11′03″W
- Country: France
- Region: Nouvelle-Aquitaine
- Department: Charente-Maritime
- Arrondissement: Jonzac
- Canton: Les Trois Monts
- Intercommunality: Haute-Saintonge

Government
  - Mayor (2020–2026): Michel Masero
- Area^{1}: 22.72 km^{2} (8.77 sq mi)
- Elevation: 85 m (279 ft)
- Highest elevation: 150 m (490 ft)
- Lowest elevation: 43 m (141 ft)
- Population (2023): 378
  - Density: 16.6/km^{2} (43.1/sq mi)
- Time zone: UTC+01:00 (CET)
  - Summer (DST): UTC+02:00 (CEST)
- INSEE/Postal code: 17260 /17270
- ^{1} French Land Register data, which excludes lakes, ponds, glaciers > 1 km^{2} (0.386 sq mi or 247 acres) and river estuaries.

Neuvicq (French pronunciation: [nøvik]) is a commune in the Charente-Maritime department in southwestern France.

== Population ==
Historical population
Year	Pop.	±% p.a.
1968	457	—
1975	406	−1.68%
1982	340	−2.50%
1990	331	−0.33%
1999	306	−0.87%
2007	414	+3.85%
2012	409	−0.24%
2017	452	+2.02%
2023	378	−2.94%
Source: INSEE

== See also ==
- Communes of the Charente-Maritime department
