= La Genétouze, Charente-Maritime =

La Genétouze
- Commune
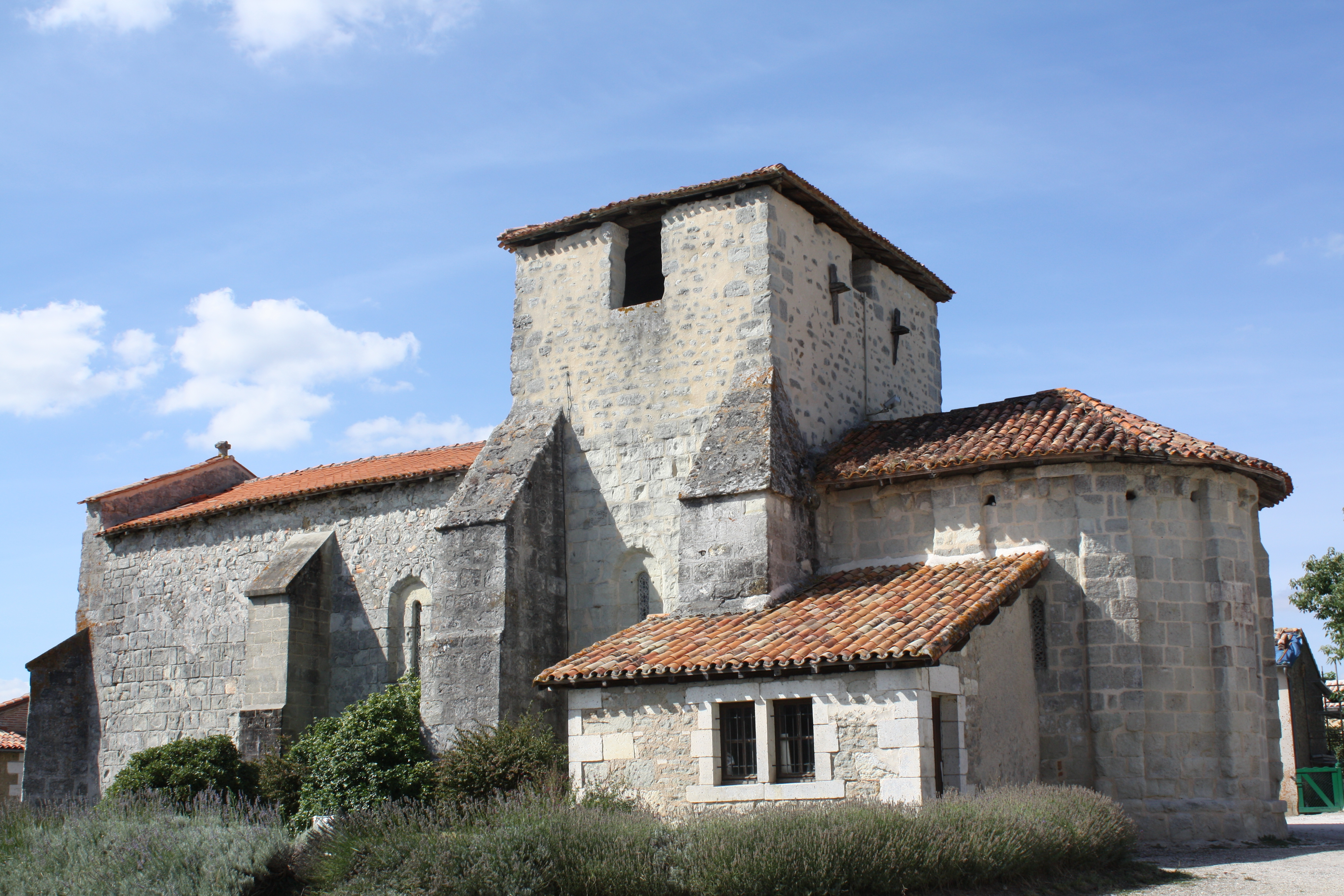
- The church in La Genétouze
- Location of La Genétouze
- Location within France Location within Nouvelle-Aquitaine
- Coordinates: 45°13′13″N 0°01′35″W
- Country: France
- Region: Nouvelle-Aquitaine
- Department: Charente-Maritime
- Arrondissement: Jonzac
- Canton: Les Trois Monts
- Intercommunality: Haute-Saintonge

Government
  - Mayor (2020–2026): Michel Marty
- Area^{1}: 37.03 km^{2} (14.30 sq mi)
- Elevation: 33 m (108 ft)
- Highest elevation: 131 m (430 ft)
- Lowest elevation: 27 m (89 ft)
- Population (2023): 217
  - Density: 5.86/km^{2} (15.2/sq mi)
- Time zone: UTC+01:00 (CET)
  - Summer (DST): UTC+02:00 (CEST)
- INSEE/Postal code: 17173 /17360
- ^{1} French Land Register data, which excludes lakes, ponds, glaciers > 1 km^{2} (0.386 sq mi or 247 acres) and river estuaries.

La Genétouze (French pronunciation: [la ʒənetuz]) is a commune in the Charente-Maritime department in southwestern France.

== Population ==
Historical population
Year	Pop.	±% p.a.
1968	379	—
1975	327	−2.09%
1982	305	−0.99%
1990	268	−1.60%
1999	259	−0.38%
2007	214	−2.36%
2012	209	−0.47%
2017	230	+1.93%
2023	217	−0.97%
Source: INSEE

== See also ==
- Communes of the Charente-Maritime department
