= Messac, Charente-Maritime =

Messac
- Commune
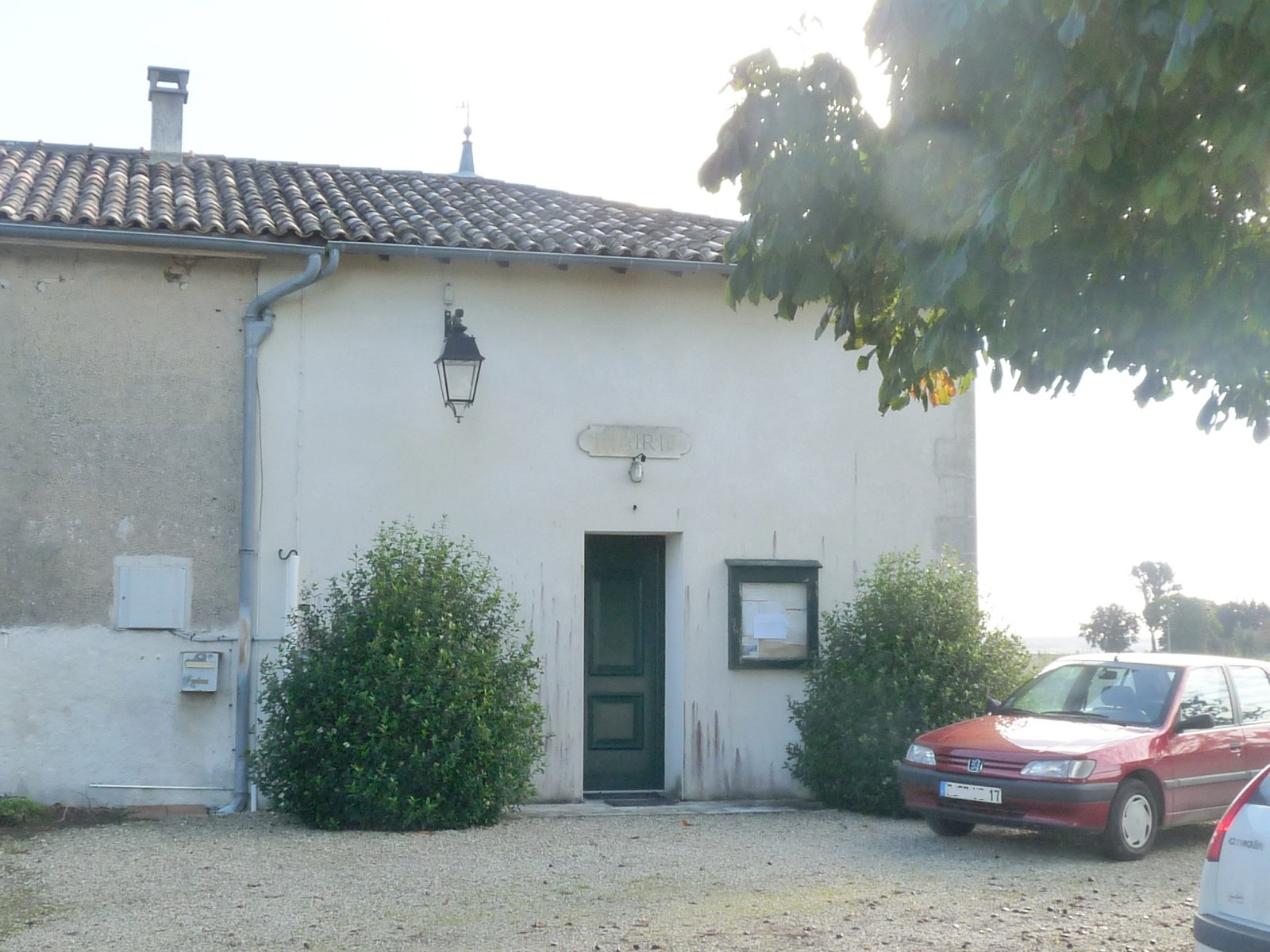
- The town hall in Messac
- Location of Messac
- Location within France Location within Nouvelle-Aquitaine
- Coordinates: 45°20′50″N 0°18′45″W
- Country: France
- Region: Nouvelle-Aquitaine
- Department: Charente-Maritime
- Arrondissement: Jonzac
- Canton: Les Trois Monts
- Intercommunality: Haute-Saintonge

Government
  - Mayor (2020–2026): Bernard Seguin
- Area^{1}: 7.24 km^{2} (2.80 sq mi)
- Elevation: 65 m (213 ft)
- Highest elevation: 106 m (348 ft)
- Lowest elevation: 45 m (148 ft)
- Population (2023): 102
  - Density: 14.1/km^{2} (36.5/sq mi)
- Time zone: UTC+01:00 (CET)
  - Summer (DST): UTC+02:00 (CEST)
- INSEE/Postal code: 17231 /17130
- ^{1} French Land Register data, which excludes lakes, ponds, glaciers > 1 km^{2} (0.386 sq mi or 247 acres) and river estuaries.

Messac (French pronunciation: [mesak]) is a commune in the Charente-Maritime department in southwestern France.

== Population ==
Historical population
Year	Pop.	±% p.a.
1968	157	—
1975	143	−1.33%
1982	135	−0.82%
1990	127	−0.76%
1999	107	−1.89%
2007	109	+0.23%
2012	110	+0.18%
2017	105	−0.93%
2023	102	−0.48%
Source: INSEE

== See also ==
- Communes of the Charente-Maritime department
