= Clérac =

- Commune
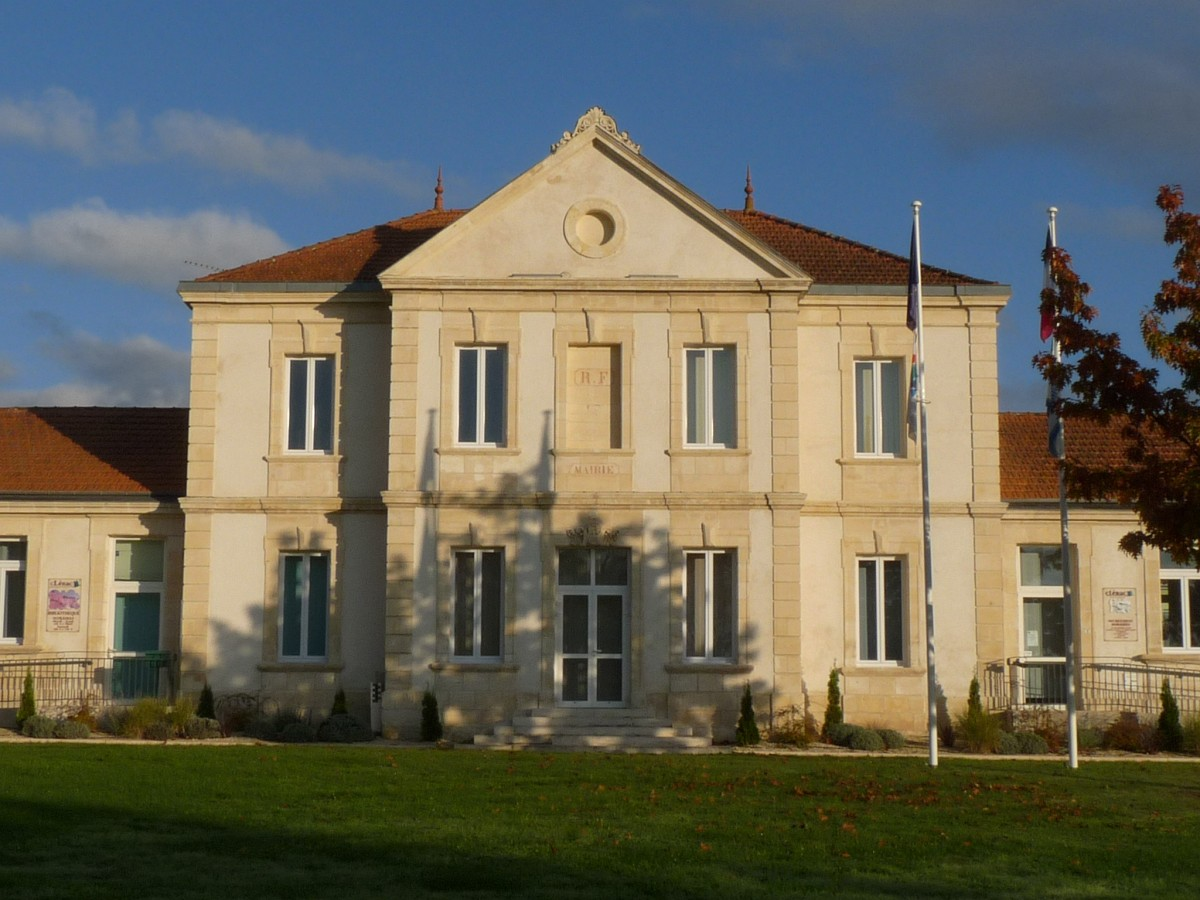
- Town hall
- Location of Clérac
- Location within France Location within Nouvelle-Aquitaine
- Coordinates: 45°10′51″N 0°13′40″W
- Country: France
- Region: Nouvelle-Aquitaine
- Department: Charente-Maritime
- Arrondissement: Jonzac
- Canton: Les Trois Monts
- Intercommunality: Haute-Saintonge

Government
  - Mayor (2020–2026): Michel Quod
- Area^{1}: 43.08 km^{2} (16.63 sq mi)
- Elevation: 90 m (300 ft)
- Highest elevation: 116 m (381 ft)
- Lowest elevation: 27 m (89 ft)
- Population (2023): 1,074
  - Density: 24.93/km^{2} (64.57/sq mi)
- Time zone: UTC+01:00 (CET)
  - Summer (DST): UTC+02:00 (CEST)
- INSEE/Postal code: 17110 /17270
- ^{1} French Land Register data, which excludes lakes, ponds, glaciers > 1 km^{2} (0.386 sq mi or 247 acres) and river estuaries.

Clérac (French pronunciation: [kleʁak]) is a commune in the Charente-Maritime department in southwestern France.

The historian and philologist James Germain Février (1895–1976) was born in Clérac.

== Population ==
Historical population
Year	Pop.	±% p.a.
1968	1,143	—
1975	1,132	−0.14%
1982	1,097	−0.45%
1990	961	−1.64%
1999	937	−0.28%
2007	932	−0.07%
2012	968	+0.76%
2017	977	+0.19%
2023	1,074	+1.59%
Source: INSEE

== See also ==
- Communes of the Charente-Maritime department
