= Canton of Archiac =

Coordinates: 45°31′N 0°19′W

Archiac
- Former canton
- Interactive map of Archiac
- Country: France
- Region: Nouvelle-Aquitaine
- Department: Charente-Maritime
- No. of communes: {{{nbcomm}}}
- Disbanded: 2015
- Area: 195.24 km^{2} (75.38 sq mi)
- Population (2012): 6,813
  - Density: 34.90/km^{2} (90.38/sq mi)

The Canton of Archiac is a former canton of the Charente-Maritime département, in France. It was disbanded following the French canton reorganisation which came into effect in March 2015. It consisted of 17 communes, which joined the canton of Jonzac in 2015. It had 6,813 inhabitants (2012). The lowest point was 8 m in the commune of Celles, the highest point was in Saint-Eugène at 121 m, the average elevation was 66 m. The least populated commune was Neulles with 139 and the most populated commune was Archiac with 864.

== Communes ==
The canton comprised the following communes:

- Allas-Champagne
- Archiac
- Arthenac
- Brie-sous-Archiac
- Celles
- Cierzac
- Germignac
- Jarnac-Champagne
- Lonzac
- Neuillac
- Neulles
- Saint-Ciers-Champagne
- Saint-Eugène
- Saint-Germain-de-Vibrac
- Sainte-Lheurine
- Saint-Maigrin
- Saint-Martial-sur-Né

== Population history ==
Year	Population
1962	6,453
1968	6,901
1975	6,482
1982	6,127
1990	6,184
1999	6,148
2008	6,447
2012	6,813

== See also ==
- Cantons of the Charente-Maritime department
