= Agudelle =

- Commune
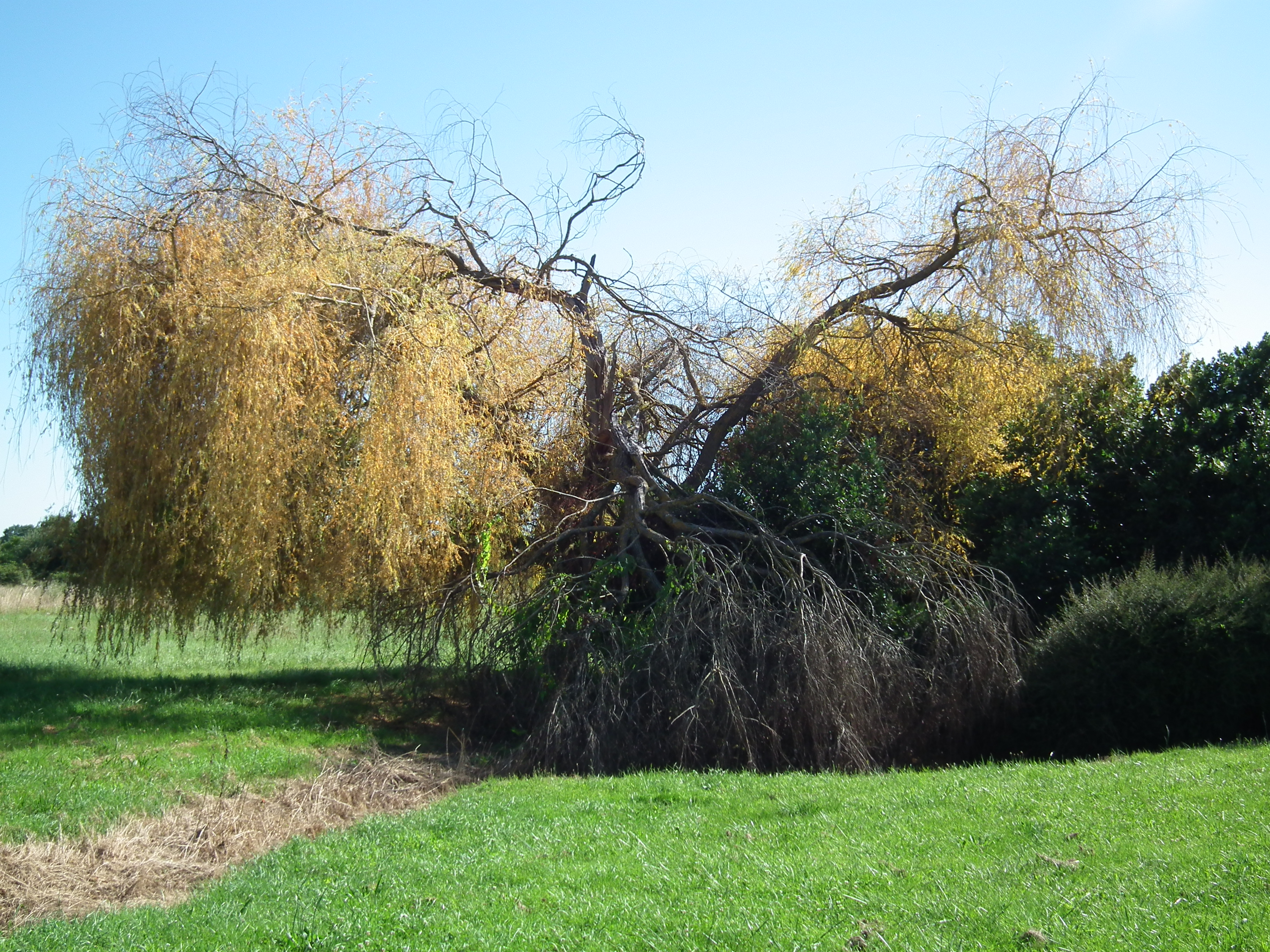
- Old tree at Agudelle
- Location of Agudelle
- Location within France Location within Nouvelle-Aquitaine
- Coordinates: 45°23′04″N 0°28′19″W
- Country: France
- Region: Nouvelle-Aquitaine
- Department: Charente-Maritime
- Arrondissement: Jonzac
- Canton: Jonzac
- Intercommunality: Haute Saintonge

Government
  - Mayor (2020–2026): Roland Arrivé
- Area^{1}: 5.36 km^{2} (2.07 sq mi)
- Elevation: 72 m (236 ft)
- Highest elevation: 77 m (253 ft)
- Lowest elevation: 47 m (154 ft)
- Population (2023): 131
  - Density: 24.4/km^{2} (63.3/sq mi)
- Time zone: UTC+01:00 (CET)
  - Summer (DST): UTC+02:00 (CEST)
- INSEE/Postal code: 17002 /17500
- ^{1} French Land Register data, which excludes lakes, ponds, glaciers > 1 km^{2} (0.386 sq mi or 247 acres) and river estuaries.

Agudelle (French pronunciation: [aɡydɛl]) is a commune in the Charente-Maritime department in the Nouvelle-Aquitaine region of southwestern France.

== Geography ==
Agudelle is located some 7 km south by south-west of Jonzac and 10 km east of Mirambeau. It can be accessed by the D153 road from Nieul-le-Virouil in the west to the village then continuing east to join the D19 road. There is also the D154E1 from Salignac-de-Mirambeau in the south through the commune to the village. There is a network of country roads covering the whole commune. The commune is mostly farmland with a large forest in the north and patches of forest in the south. Apart from the village there is also the hamlet of Chez Nicoleau in the south of the commune. The altitude varies from 47 to 77 metres above sea level.

The western border of the commune consists of a stream which flows into the Etang d'Allas just outside the north-western border of the commune. The eastern border of the commune is delineated by the Maine stream which flows north.

== History ==
In the 12th century Agudelle forest belonged to the Order of Fontevraud. The chapel was given to Lambert, the founder of the Abbey of Our Lady of the Crown in 1116 to establish a priory.

== Administration ==
List of Successive Mayors of Agudelle

From	To	Name	Party
2001	2026	Roland Arrivé	DVG then PS

=== Canton ===
Agudelle is part of the Canton of Jonzac together with 19 other communes.

=== Inter-Communality ===
Agudelle part of the Community of communes of Haute-Saintonge. This group includes 123 communes in the south of Charente-Maritime and is the largest intercommunal structure in France.

== Population ==
Historical population

Year	Pop.	±% p.a.
1793	242	—
1821	232	−0.15%
1846	244	+0.20%
1872	239	−0.08%
1901	210	−0.45%
1926	198	−0.24%
1946	180	−0.48%
1962	165	−0.54%
1968	166	+0.10%

Year	Pop.	±% p.a.
1975	118	−4.76%
1982	119	+0.12%
1990	99	−2.27%
1999	126	+2.72%
2007	113	−1.35%
2012	123	+1.71%
2017	134	+1.73%
2023	131	−0.38%

Source: EHESS and INSEE

== Economy ==
The main product of the commune is grapes for cognac and Pineau des Charentes.

== Sites and Monuments ==
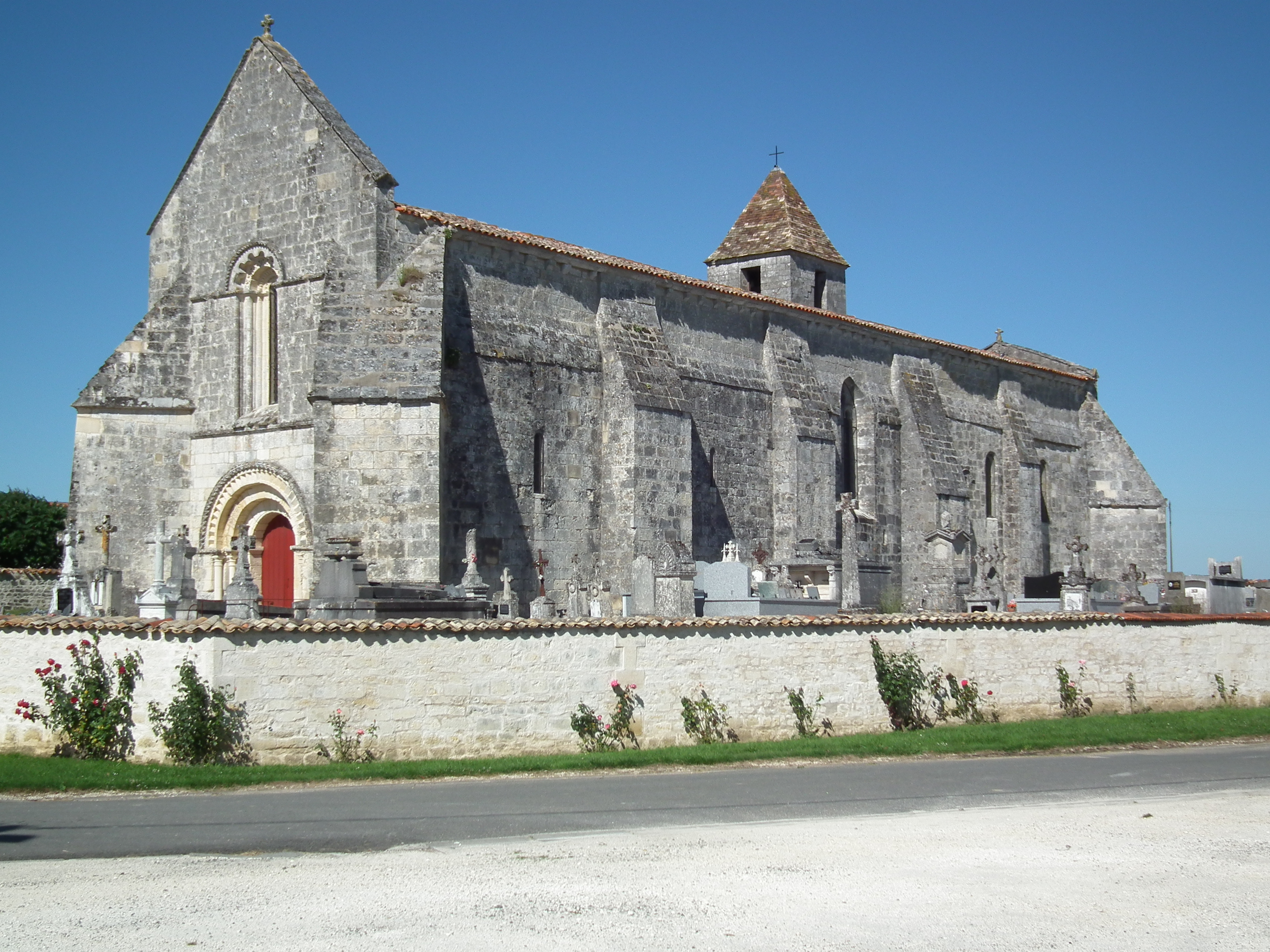
The Church of Eutropius

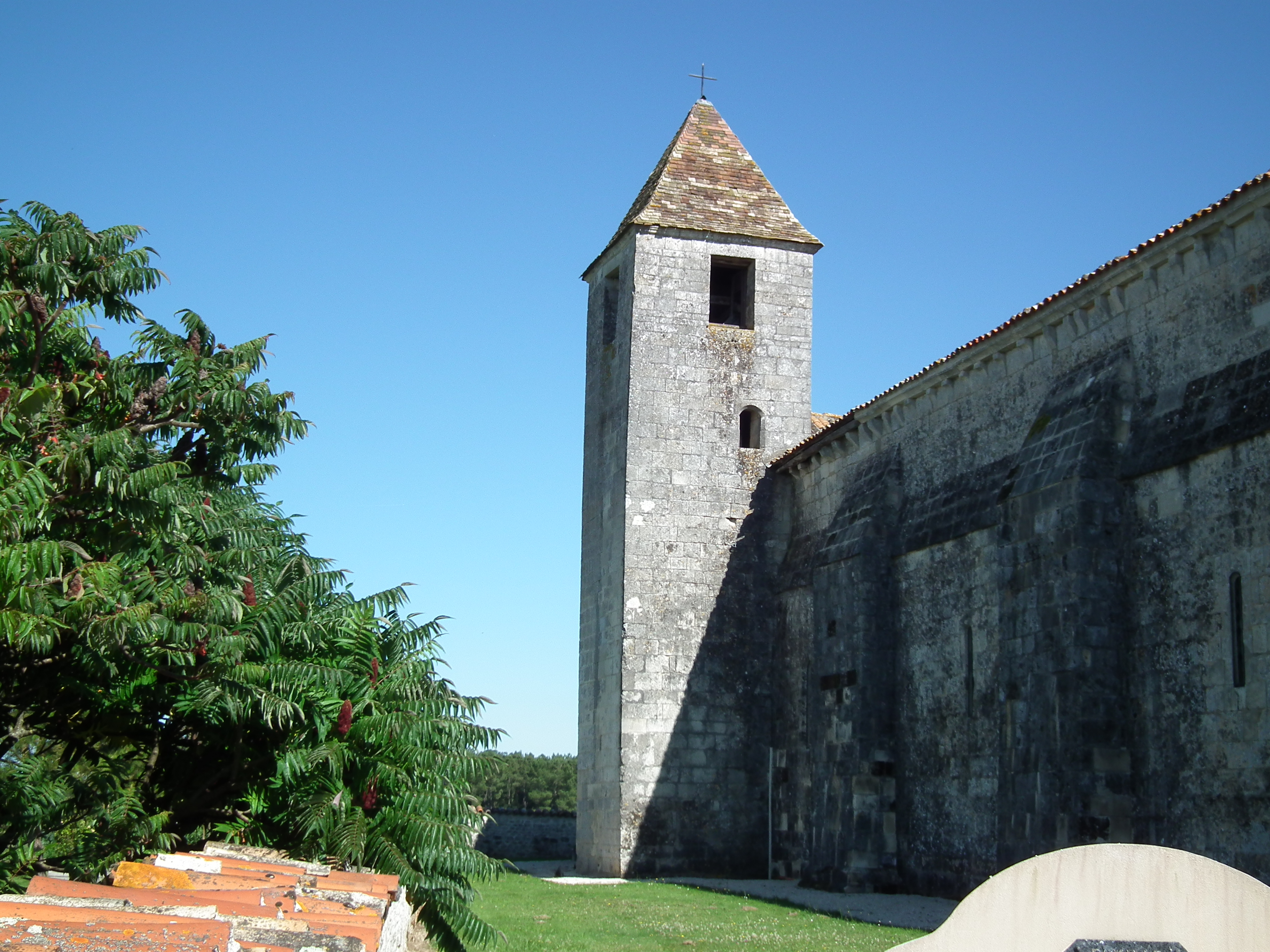
The Bell Tower

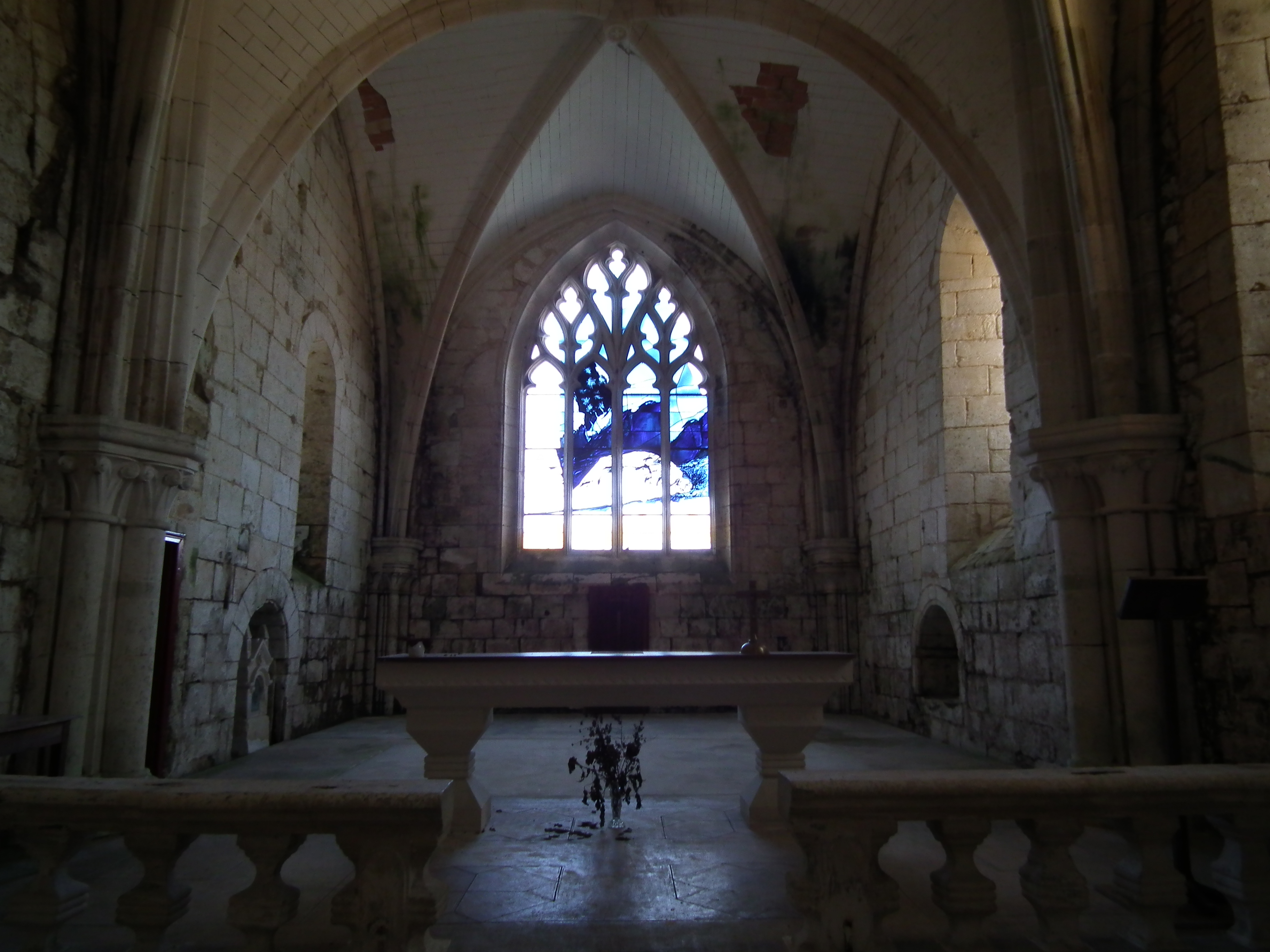
Inside the church

- The Church of Saint Eutropius (12th century) has been listed as a historical monument since 31 December 1986. The church contains two items that are registered as historical objects:
  - A Statue: Saint Eutropius (17th century) in polychrome wood.
  - A Bronze Bell (1556)
- The Tower House dates from the 19th century.

== See also ==
- Communes of the Charente-Maritime department
