= Allas-Bocage =

- Commune
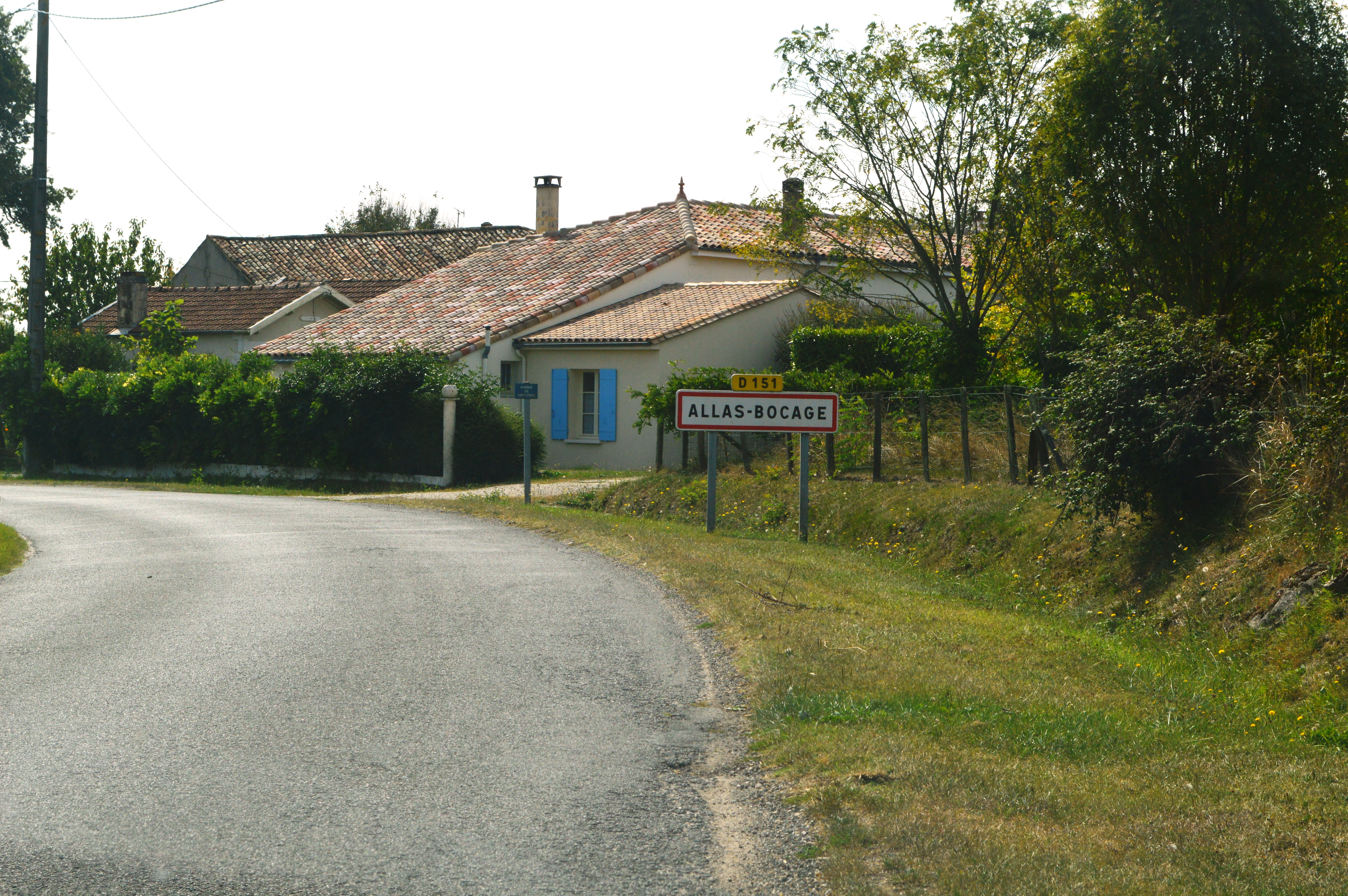
- The road into Allas-Bocage
- Location of Allas-Bocage
- Location within France Location within Nouvelle-Aquitaine
- Coordinates: 45°23′02″N 0°29′31″W
- Country: France
- Region: Nouvelle-Aquitaine
- Department: Charente-Maritime
- Arrondissement: Jonzac
- Canton: Jonzac
- Intercommunality: Haute Saintonge

Government
  - Mayor (2020–2026): Bernard Brossard
- Area^{1}: 10.87 km^{2} (4.20 sq mi)
- Highest elevation: 108 m (354 ft)
- Lowest elevation: 39 m (128 ft)
- Population (2023): 194
  - Density: 17.8/km^{2} (46.2/sq mi)
- Time zone: UTC+01:00 (CET)
  - Summer (DST): UTC+02:00 (CEST)
- INSEE/Postal code: 17005 /17150
- ^{1} French Land Register data, which excludes lakes, ponds, glaciers > 1 km^{2} (0.386 sq mi or 247 acres) and river estuaries.

Allas-Bocage is a commune in Charente-Maritime, Nouvelle-Aquitaine, France.

== Geography ==
Allas-Bocage is located some 5 km north-east of Mirambeau and 40 km south by south-west of Cognac. It can be accessed by the minor D151 road running off the D730 in the south-west and continuing north-east through the commune to the village then north to Jonzac. The D153 road also goes from Nieul-le-Virouil in the north-west through the commune north of the village and continues to join the D19 highway in the east. The D50 road from Nieul-le-Virouil also passes through the western part of the commune going south to Soubran. There are three hamlets in the commune apart from the village: Le Pain, Le Maine-Neuf, and Berceleu. The commune is mostly farmland with forests along the eastern border.

The Tarnac river forms the western border of the commune and an unnamed stream forms much of the southern border of the commune flowing west to join the Ruisseau de Fanioux to form the Tarnac river. The Etang d'Allas is an elongated lake which forms the north-eastern border of the commune and the stream that flows out of the lake forms the northern border before joining the Maine in the north.

== Administration ==
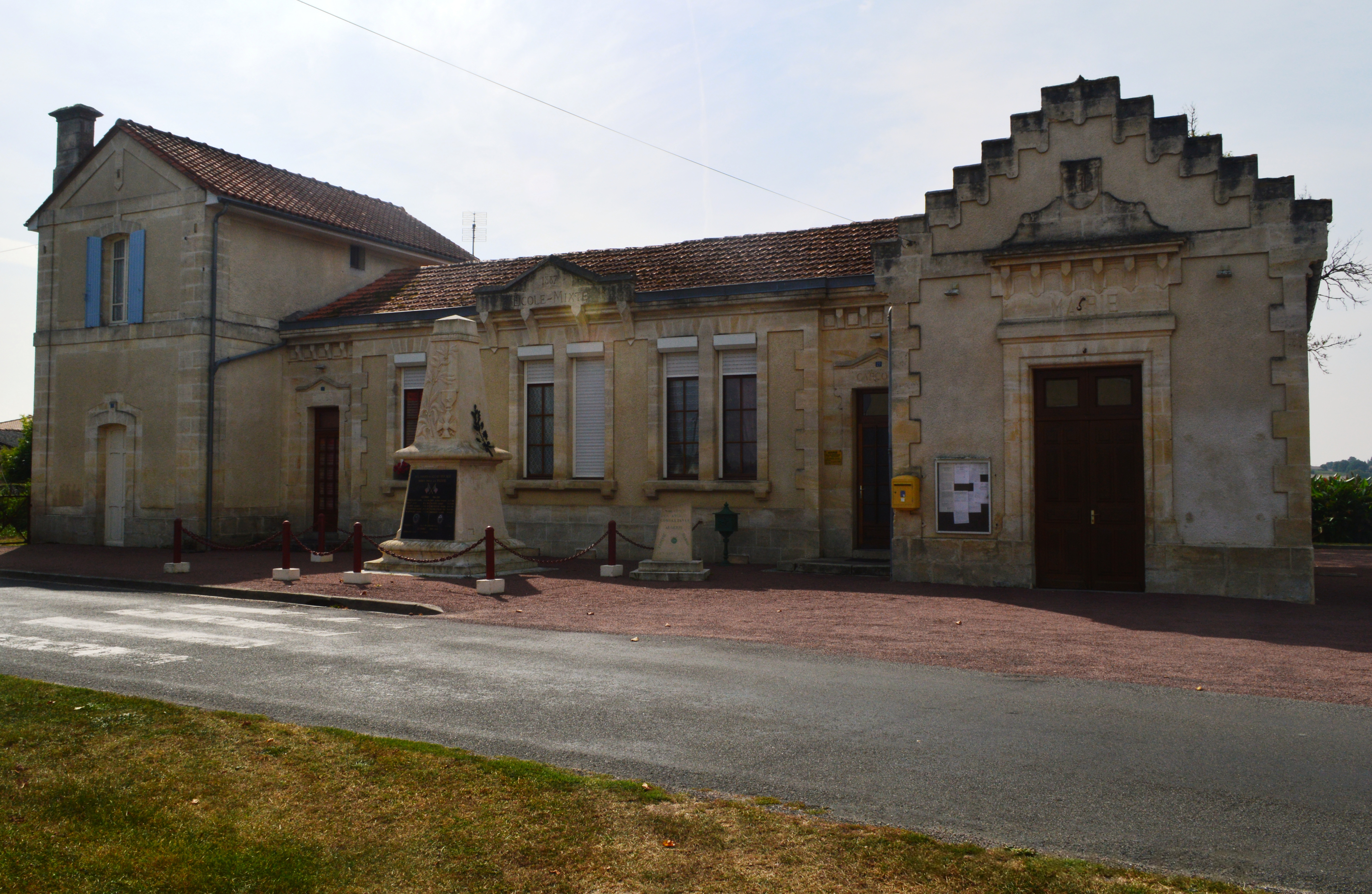
The Town Hall

List of Successive Mayors

| From | To | Name | Party | Position |
|---|---|---|---|---|
| 2001 | 2014 | Paul Viel | DVG | Retired |
| 2014 | 2026 | Bernard Brossard | DVG | |

== Population ==
The inhabitants of the commune are known as Allasiens or Allasiennes in French.

Historical population
| Year | Pop. | ±% p.a. |
|---|---|---|
| 1968 | 186 | — |
| 1975 | 189 | +0.23% |
| 1982 | 173 | −1.26% |
| 1990 | 163 | −0.74% |
| 1999 | 150 | −0.92% |
| 2007 | 186 | +2.73% |
| 2012 | 211 | +2.55% |
| 2017 | 195 | −1.56% |
| 2023 | 194 | −0.09% |
Source: INSEE

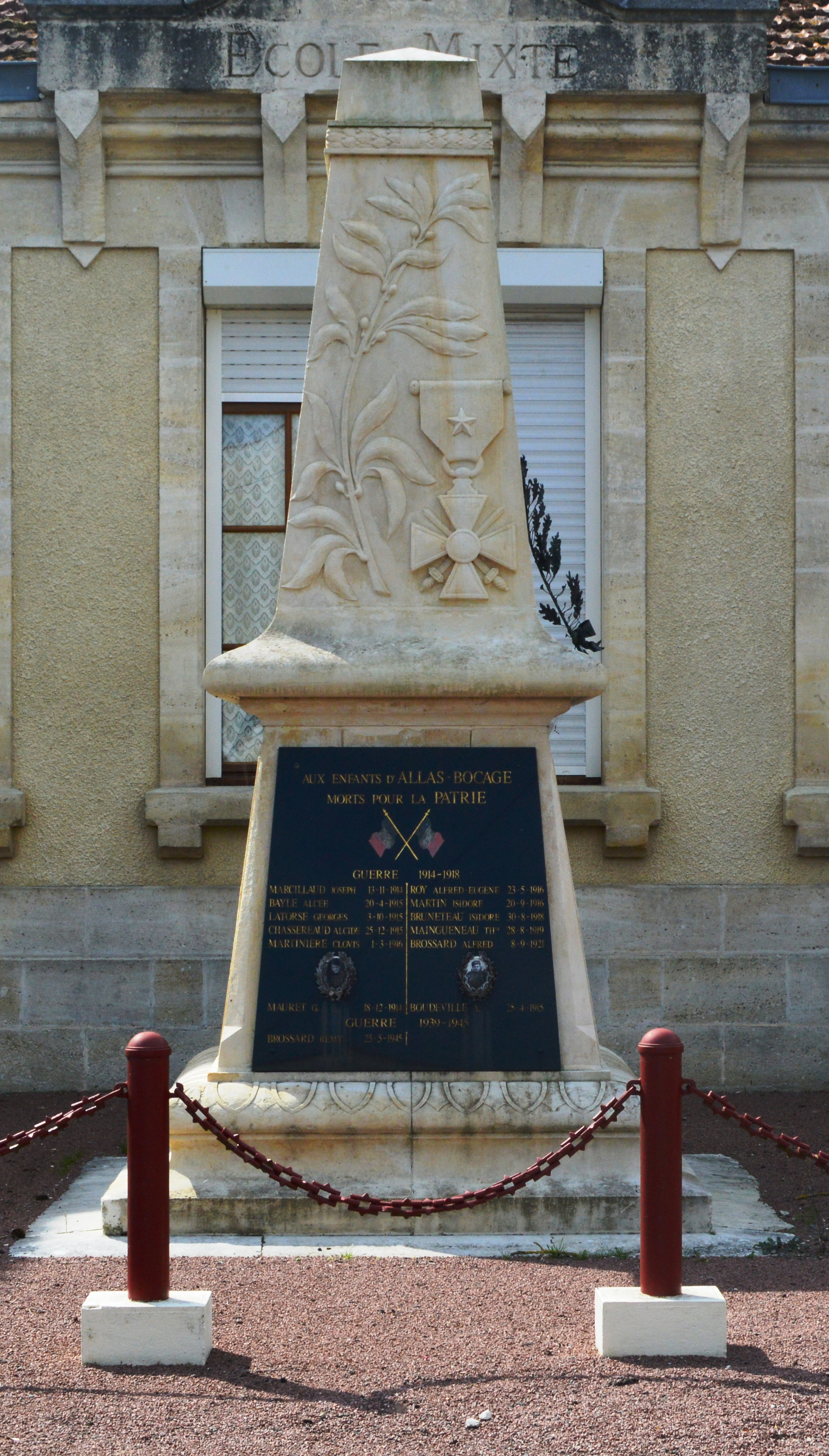
Allas-Bocage War Memorial

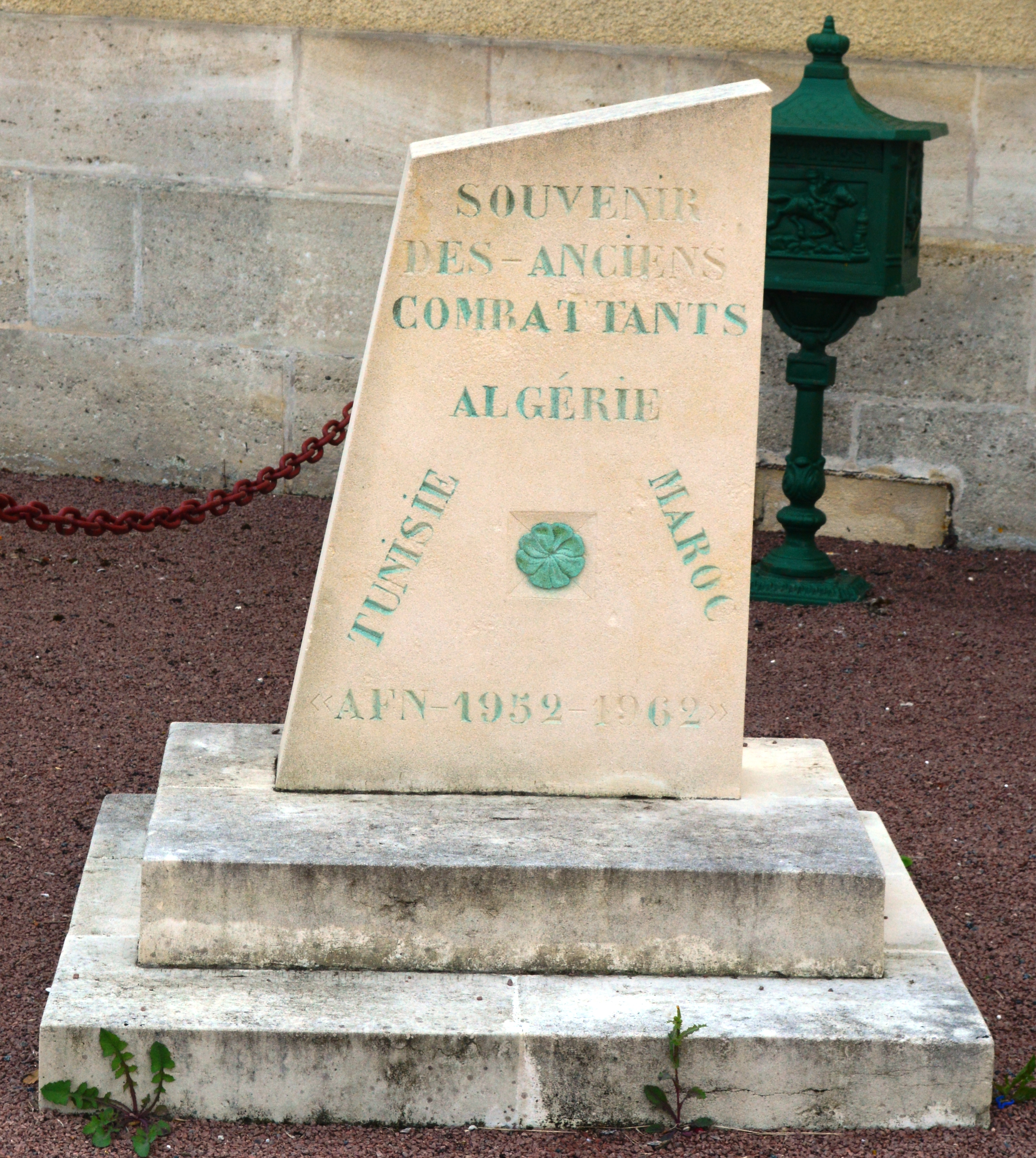
Algerian War Memorial

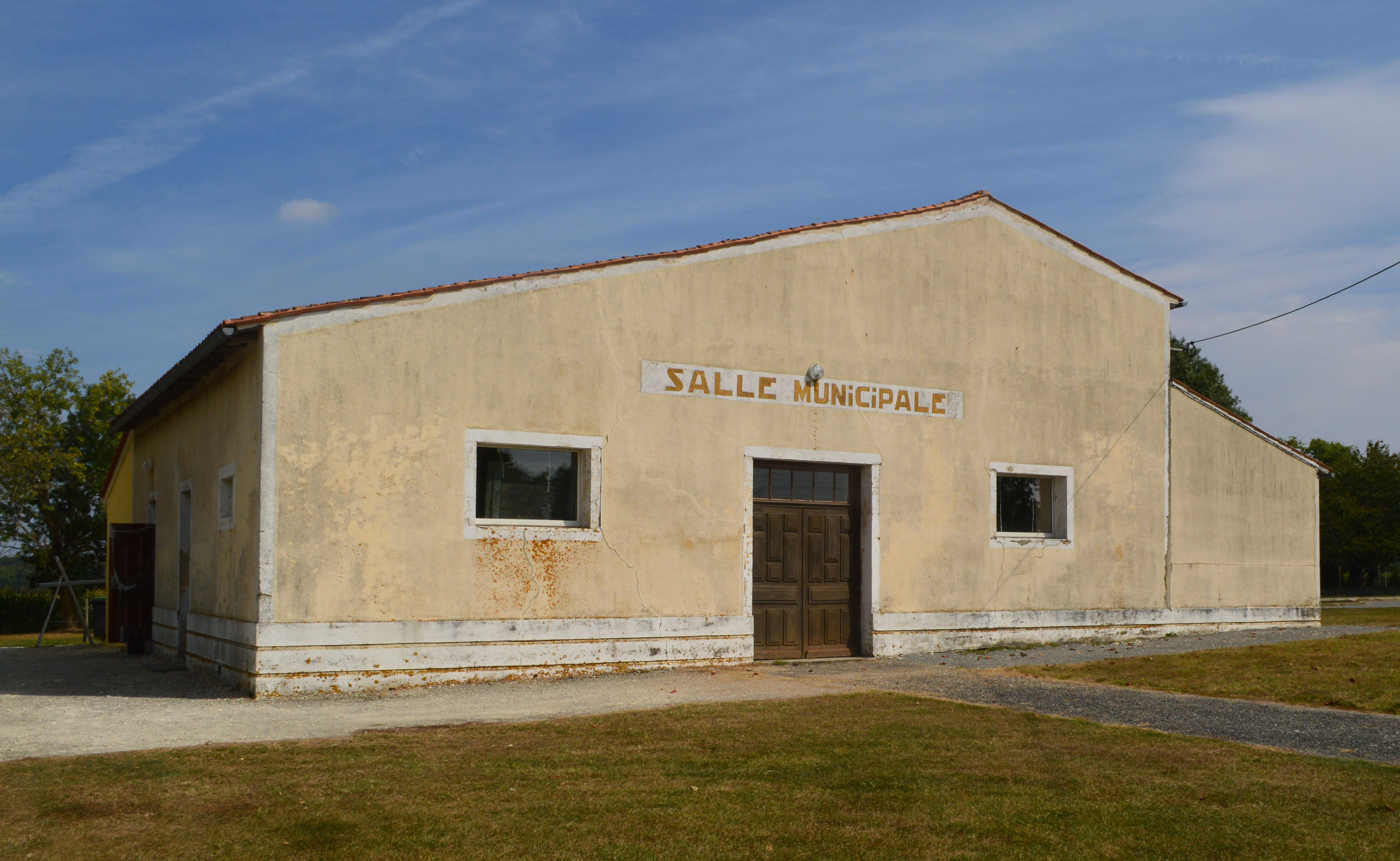
The Community Hall

== Sites and Monuments ==
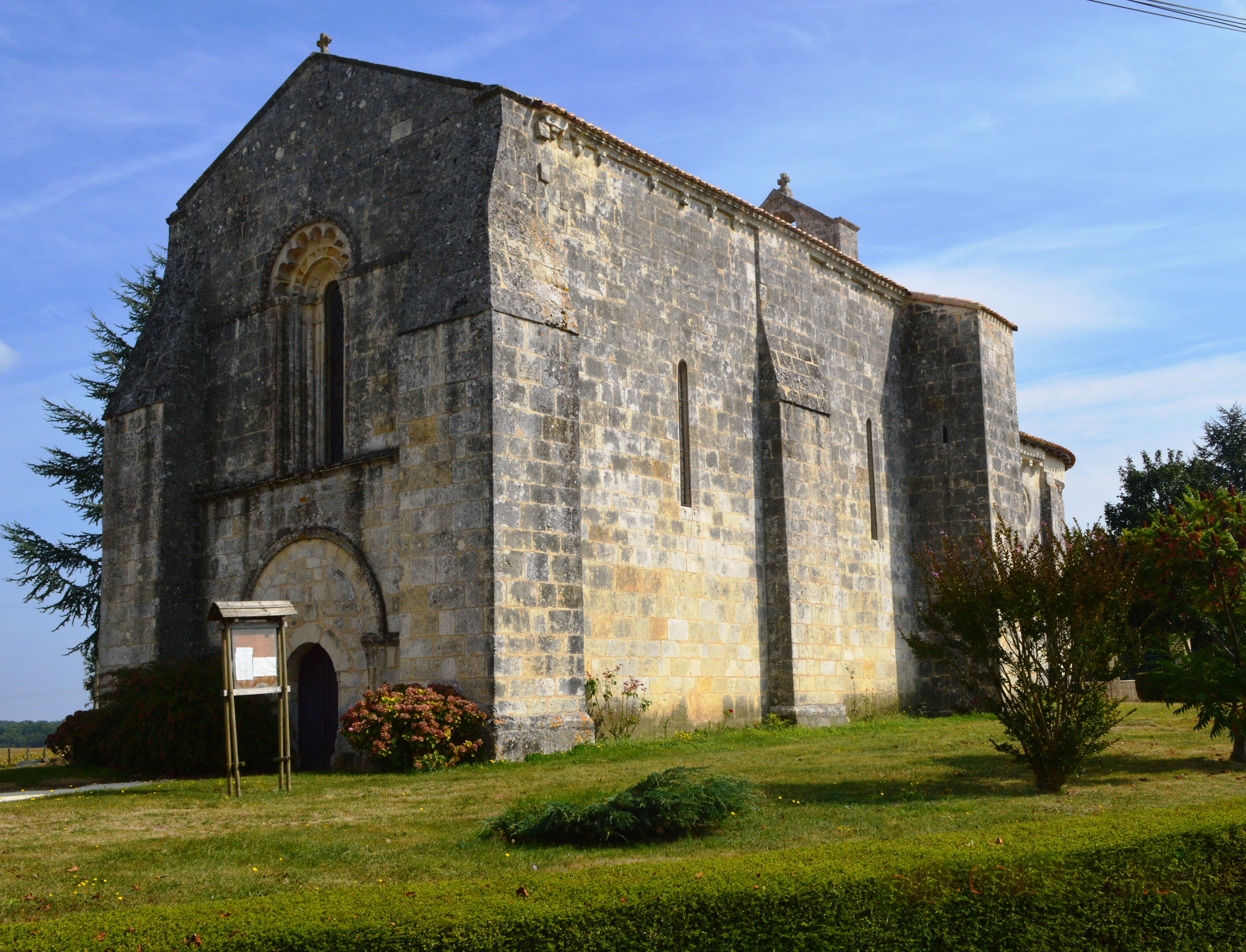
The Church of Saint Martin

The Church of Saint Martin (12th century) is a Romanesque building that is registered as an historical monument. It contains four items listed as historical monuments since 5 December 1908:

- A Tombstone (1261)
- A Bronze bell (1618) in the small bell tower.
- A Stoup (15th century) carved on three sides with angels, the sun, and a gable.
- A Baptismal font (15th century)

== See also ==
- Communes of the Charente-Maritime department
