= Saint-Sigismond-de-Clermont =

- Commune
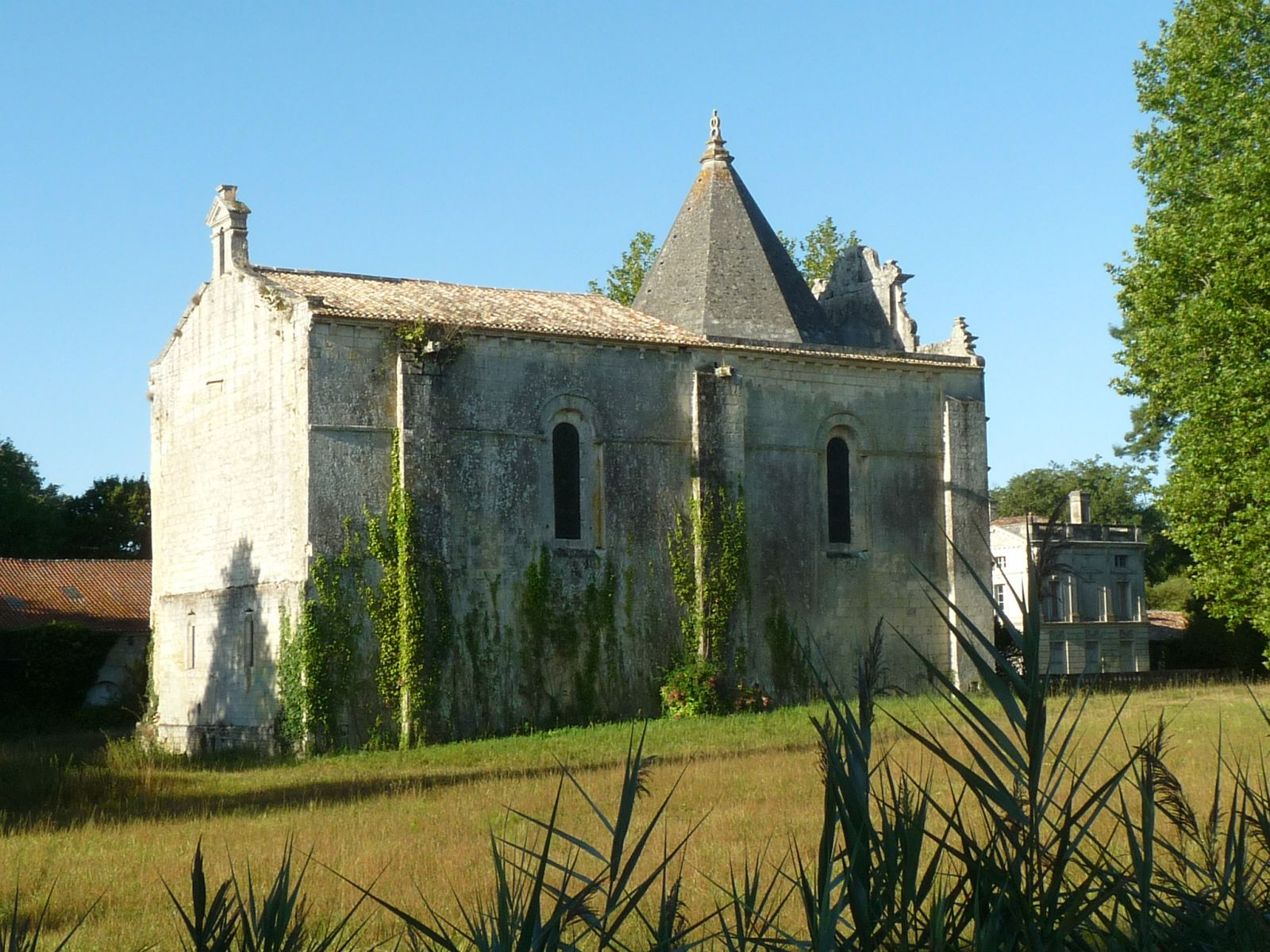
- The chateau chapel in Saint-Sigismond-de-Clermont
- Location of Saint-Sigismond-de-Clermont
- Location within France Location within Nouvelle-Aquitaine
- Coordinates: 45°27′08″N 0°32′02″W
- Country: France
- Region: Nouvelle-Aquitaine
- Department: Charente-Maritime
- Arrondissement: Jonzac
- Canton: Jonzac
- Intercommunality: Haute-Saintonge

Government
  - Mayor (2020–2026): Bernadette Octeau
- Area^{1}: 5.28 km^{2} (2.04 sq mi)
- Elevation: 30 m (98 ft)
- Highest elevation: 52 m (171 ft)
- Lowest elevation: 24 m (79 ft)
- Population (2023): 161
  - Density: 30.5/km^{2} (79.0/sq mi)
- Time zone: UTC+01:00 (CET)
  - Summer (DST): UTC+02:00 (CEST)
- INSEE/Postal code: 17402 /17240
- ^{1} French Land Register data, which excludes lakes, ponds, glaciers > 1 km^{2} (0.386 sq mi or 247 acres) and river estuaries.

Saint-Sigismond-de-Clermont (French pronunciation: [sɛ̃ siʒismɔ̃ də klɛʁmɔ̃]) is a commune in the Charente-Maritime department in southwestern France.

== Population ==
Historical population
Year	Pop.	±% p.a.
1968	137	—
1975	122	−1.64%
1982	114	−0.96%
1990	107	−0.79%
1999	138	+2.87%
2007	159	+1.79%
2012	167	+0.99%
2017	159	−0.98%
2023	161	+0.21%
Source: INSEE

== See also ==
- Communes of the Charente-Maritime department
