= Ozillac =

- Commune
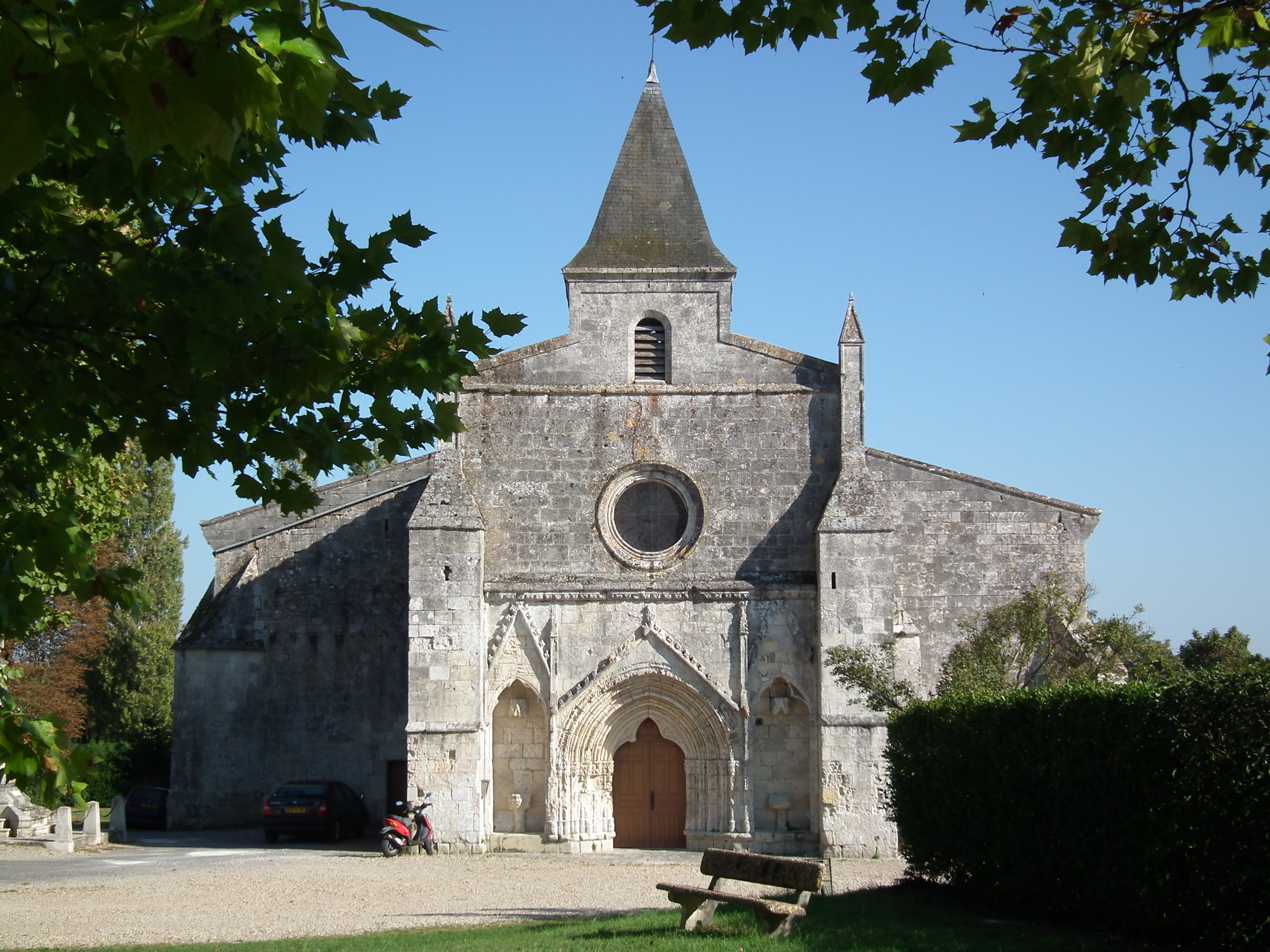
- The church in Ozillac
- Location of Ozillac
- Location within France Location within Nouvelle-Aquitaine
- Coordinates: 45°23′41″N 0°23′32″W
- Country: France
- Region: Nouvelle-Aquitaine
- Department: Charente-Maritime
- Arrondissement: Jonzac
- Canton: Jonzac

Government
  - Mayor (2020–2026): Stéphane Mignot
- Area^{1}: 15.93 km^{2} (6.15 sq mi)
- Highest elevation: 101 m (331 ft)
- Lowest elevation: 32 m (105 ft)
- Population (2023): 613
  - Density: 38.5/km^{2} (99.7/sq mi)
- Time zone: UTC+01:00 (CET)
  - Summer (DST): UTC+02:00 (CEST)
- INSEE/Postal code: 17270 /17500
- ^{1} French Land Register data, which excludes lakes, ponds, glaciers > 1 km^{2} (0.386 sq mi or 247 acres) and river estuaries.

Ozillac (French pronunciation: [ozijak]) is a commune in the Charente-Maritime department in the Nouvelle-Aquitaine region in southwestern France.

== Population ==
Historical population
Year	Pop.	±% p.a.
1968	623	—
1975	555	−1.64%
1982	519	−0.95%
1990	503	−0.39%
1999	558	+1.16%
2007	673	+2.37%
2012	653	−0.60%
2017	626	−0.84%
2023	613	−0.35%
Source: INSEE

== See also ==
- Communes of the Charente-Maritime department
