= Clam, Charente-Maritime =

Clam
- Commune
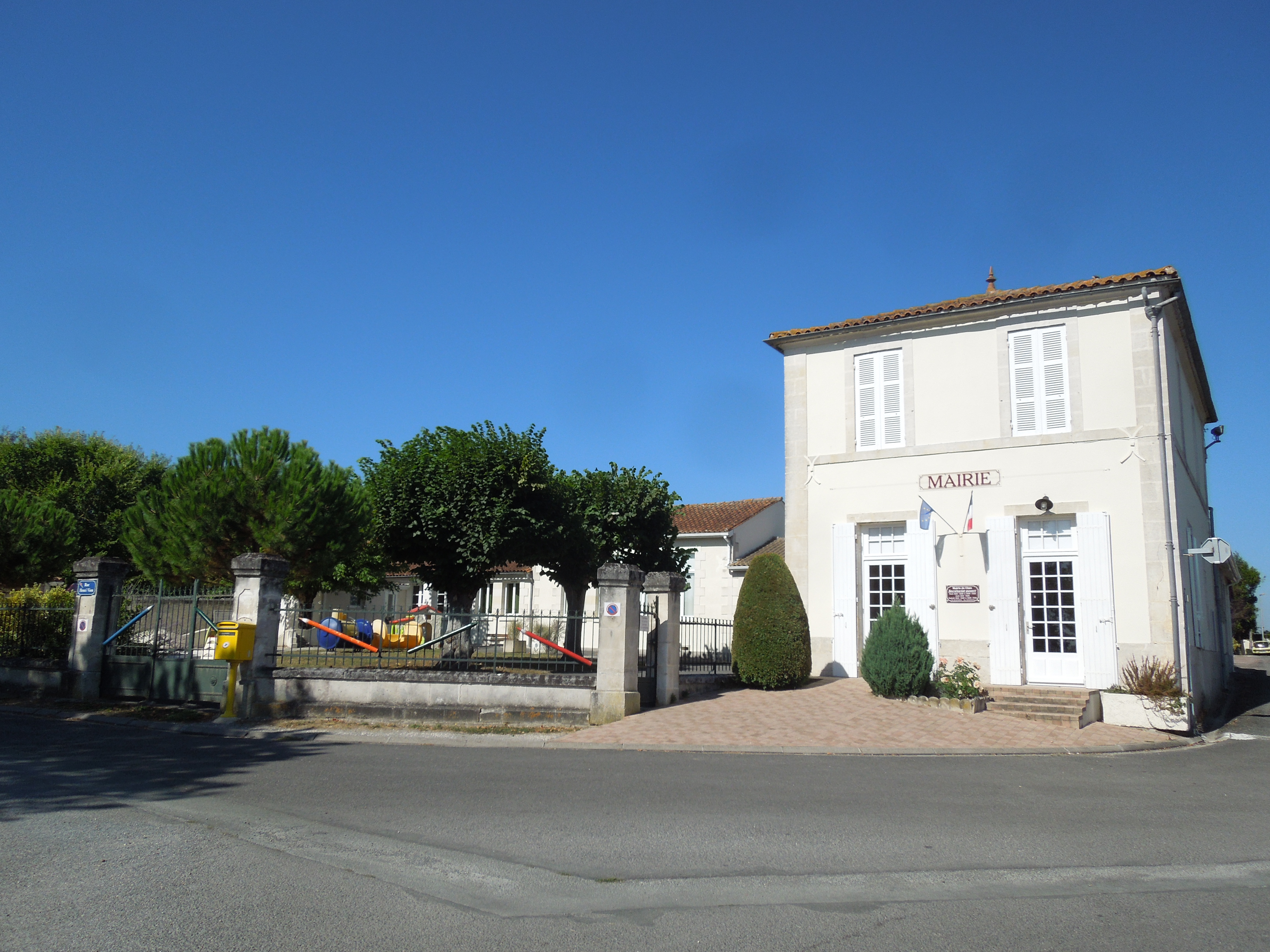
- The town hall in Clam
- Location of Clam
- Location within France Location within Nouvelle-Aquitaine
- Coordinates: 45°29′41″N 0°26′51″W
- Country: France
- Region: Nouvelle-Aquitaine
- Department: Charente-Maritime
- Arrondissement: Jonzac
- Canton: Jonzac
- Intercommunality: Haute-Saintonge

Government
  - Mayor (2020–2026): Jean-Michel Videau
- Area^{1}: 6.83 km^{2} (2.64 sq mi)
- Highest elevation: 71 m (233 ft)
- Lowest elevation: 23 m (75 ft)
- Population (2023): 418
  - Density: 61.2/km^{2} (159/sq mi)
- Time zone: UTC+01:00 (CET)
  - Summer (DST): UTC+02:00 (CEST)
- INSEE/Postal code: 17108 /17240
- ^{1} French Land Register data, which excludes lakes, ponds, glaciers > 1 km^{2} (0.386 sq mi or 247 acres) and river estuaries.

Clam is a commune with 418 residents (as of 1 January 2017) in the French department of Charente-Maritime in the Poitou-Charentes region. Clam is located in the arrondissement (eng. administrative region) as well as in the canton of Jonzac. The residents are called Clamais.

== Geography ==
Clam lies about 80 kilometers northeast of Bourdeaux. Clam is bordered by Marignac to the north and northwest, Neulles to the north and northeast, Saint-Germain-de-Luisignan to the south and east, as well as Saint-Georges-Antignac to the west.

== Population ==
Historical population
Year	Pop.	±% p.a.
1968	203	—
1975	216	+0.89%
1982	209	−0.47%
1990	237	+1.58%
1999	283	+1.99%
2007	339	+2.28%
2012	406	+3.67%
2017	418	+0.58%
2023	418	+0.00%
Source: INSEE

== Places of interest ==
- The Church of Saint-Martin from the 12th century.

== See also ==
- Communes of the Charente-Maritime department
