= Villexavier =

- Commune
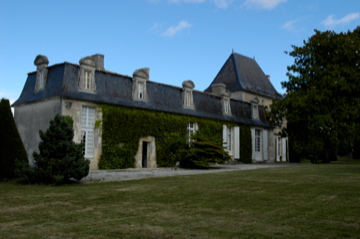
- Chateau of La Faye
- Location of Villexavier
- Location within France Location within Nouvelle-Aquitaine
- Coordinates: 45°22′21″N 0°26′11″W
- Country: France
- Region: Nouvelle-Aquitaine
- Department: Charente-Maritime
- Arrondissement: Jonzac
- Canton: Jonzac

Government
  - Mayor (2020–2026): Bastien Rabeyrolles
- Area^{1}: 9.97 km^{2} (3.85 sq mi)
- Highest elevation: 90 m (300 ft)
- Lowest elevation: 48 m (157 ft)
- Population (2023): 267
  - Density: 26.8/km^{2} (69.4/sq mi)
- Time zone: UTC+01:00 (CET)
  - Summer (DST): UTC+02:00 (CEST)
- INSEE/Postal code: 17476 /17500
- ^{1} French Land Register data, which excludes lakes, ponds, glaciers > 1 km^{2} (0.386 sq mi or 247 acres) and river estuaries.

Villexavier is a commune in the Charente-Maritime department in the Nouvelle-Aquitaine region in southwestern France.

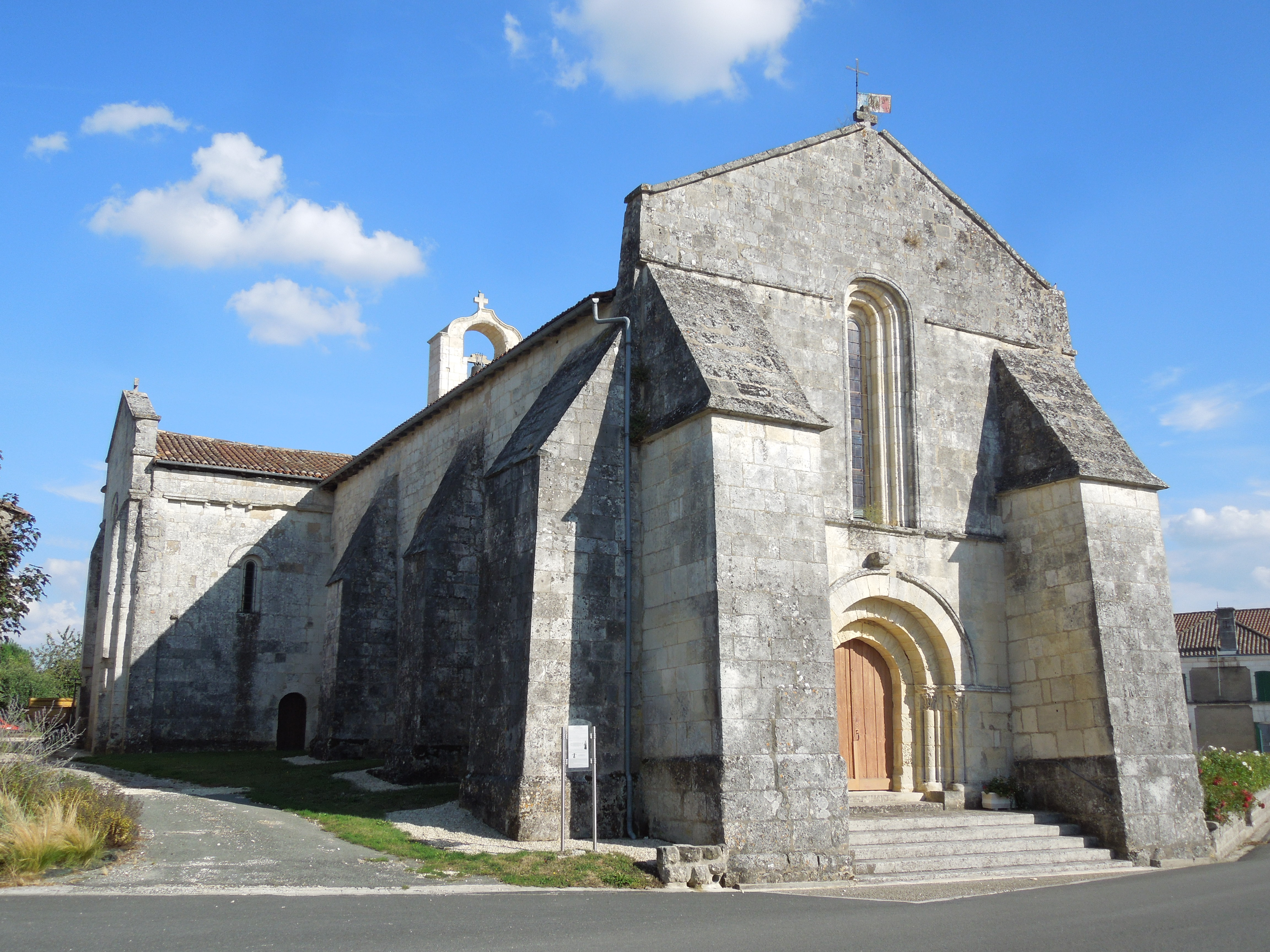
The church Saint-Christophe

== Population ==
Historical population
| Year | Pop. | ±% p.a. |
|---|---|---|
| 1968 | 274 | — |
| 1975 | 262 | −0.64% |
| 1982 | 277 | +0.80% |
| 1990 | 269 | −0.37% |
| 1999 | 247 | −0.94% |
| 2007 | 303 | +2.59% |
| 2012 | 265 | −2.64% |
| 2017 | 272 | +0.52% |
| 2023 | 267 | −0.31% |
Source: INSEE

== See also ==
- Communes of the Charente-Maritime department
