= Saint-Dizant-du-Bois =

- Commune
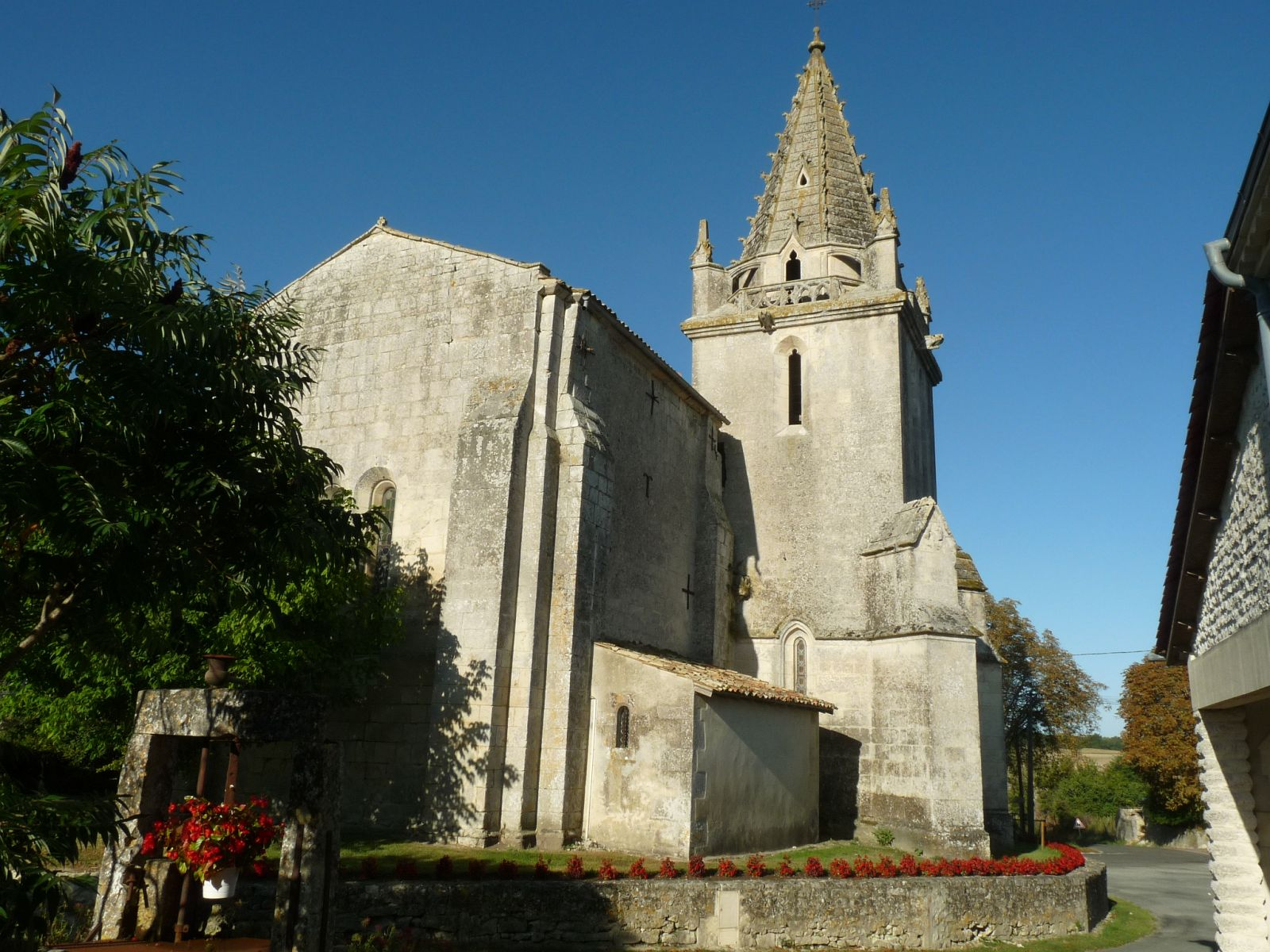
- The church in Saint-Dizant-du-Bois
- Location of Saint-Dizant-du-Bois
- Location within France Location within Nouvelle-Aquitaine
- Coordinates: 45°23′56″N 0°34′18″W
- Country: France
- Region: Nouvelle-Aquitaine
- Department: Charente-Maritime
- Arrondissement: Jonzac
- Canton: Jonzac

Government
  - Mayor (2020–2026): Gérard Cappelaere
- Area^{1}: 4.16 km^{2} (1.61 sq mi)
- Highest elevation: 94 m (308 ft)
- Lowest elevation: 44 m (144 ft)
- Population (2023): 113
  - Density: 27.2/km^{2} (70.4/sq mi)
- Time zone: UTC+01:00 (CET)
  - Summer (DST): UTC+02:00 (CEST)
- INSEE/Postal code: 17324 /17150
- ^{1} French Land Register data, which excludes lakes, ponds, glaciers > 1 km^{2} (0.386 sq mi or 247 acres) and river estuaries.

Saint-Dizant-du-Bois (French pronunciation: [sɛ̃ dizɑ̃ dy bwa]) is a commune in the Charente-Maritime department in the Nouvelle-Aquitaine region in southwestern France.

== Population ==
Historical population
Year	Pop.	±% p.a.
1968	134	—
1975	99	−4.23%
1982	103	+0.57%
1990	83	−2.66%
1999	80	−0.41%
2007	102	+3.08%
2012	123	+3.82%
2017	111	−2.03%
2023	113	+0.30%
Source: INSEE

== See also ==
- Communes of the Charente-Maritime department
