= Vibrac, Charente-Maritime =

Vibrac
- Commune
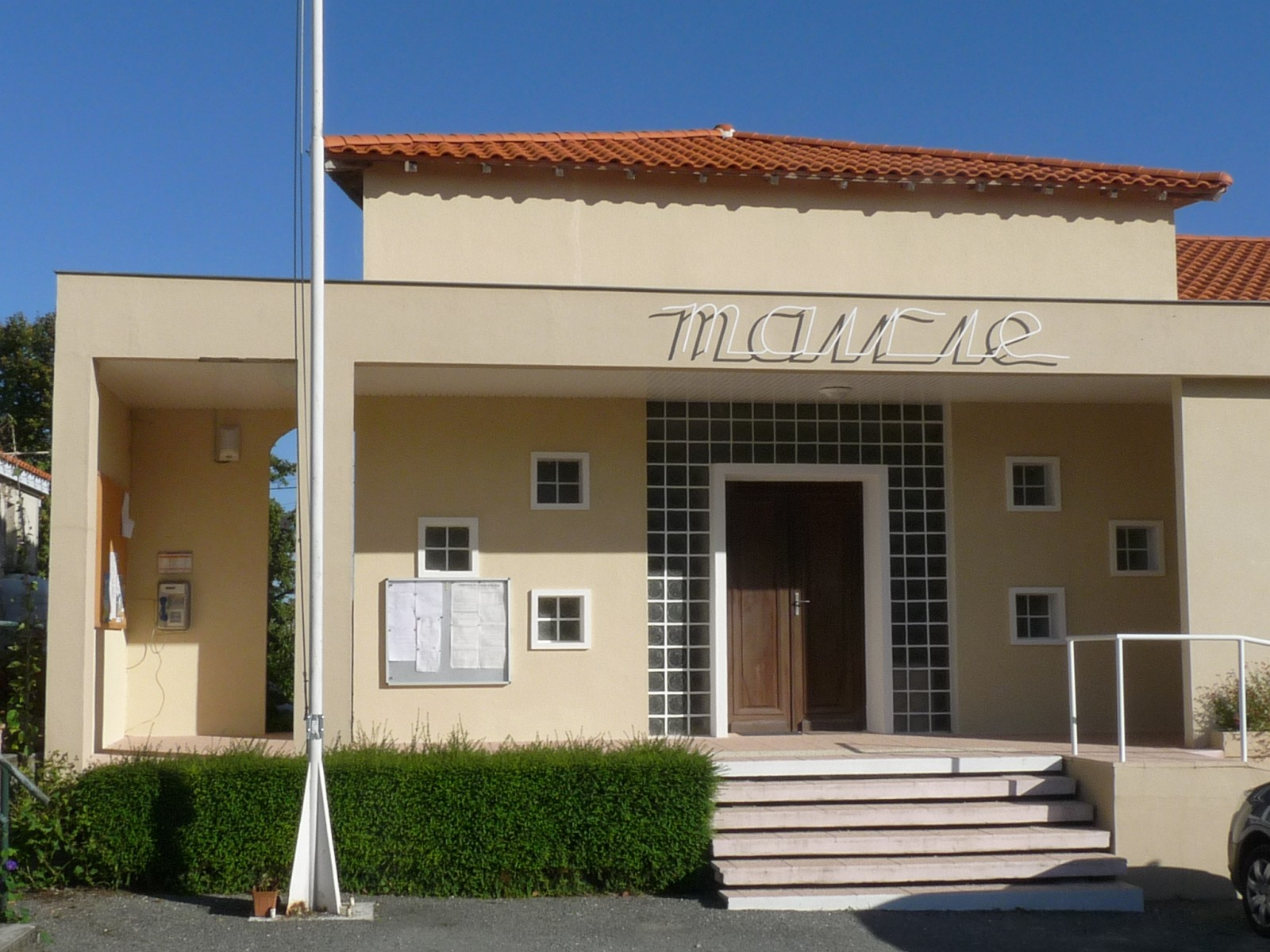
- The town hall in Vibrac
- Location of Vibrac
- Location within France Location within Nouvelle-Aquitaine
- Coordinates: 45°21′22″N 0°20′24″W
- Country: France
- Region: Nouvelle-Aquitaine
- Department: Charente-Maritime
- Arrondissement: Jonzac
- Canton: Jonzac

Government
  - Mayor (2020–2026): Éric Boursier
- Area^{1}: 5.02 km^{2} (1.94 sq mi)
- Highest elevation: 107 m (351 ft)
- Lowest elevation: 43 m (141 ft)
- Population (2023): 162
  - Density: 32.3/km^{2} (83.6/sq mi)
- Time zone: UTC+01:00 (CET)
  - Summer (DST): UTC+02:00 (CEST)
- INSEE/Postal code: 17468 /17500
- ^{1} French Land Register data, which excludes lakes, ponds, glaciers > 1 km^{2} (0.386 sq mi or 247 acres) and river estuaries.

Vibrac is a commune in the Charente-Maritime department in the Nouvelle-Aquitaine region in southwestern France.

== Geography ==
The highest point in the canton of Jonzac, elevation 109 m, is situated in the commune of Vibrac. The Seugne forms all of the commune's western border.

== Population ==
Historical population
Year	Pop.	±% p.a.
1968	160	—
1975	154	−0.54%
1982	137	−1.66%
1990	144	+0.62%
1999	168	+1.73%
2007	161	−0.53%
2012	162	+0.12%
2017	152	−1.27%
2023	162	+1.07%
Source: INSEE

== See also ==
- Communes of the Charente-Maritime department
