= Saint-Hilaire-du-Bois, Charente-Maritime =

Saint-Hilaire-du-Bois
- Commune
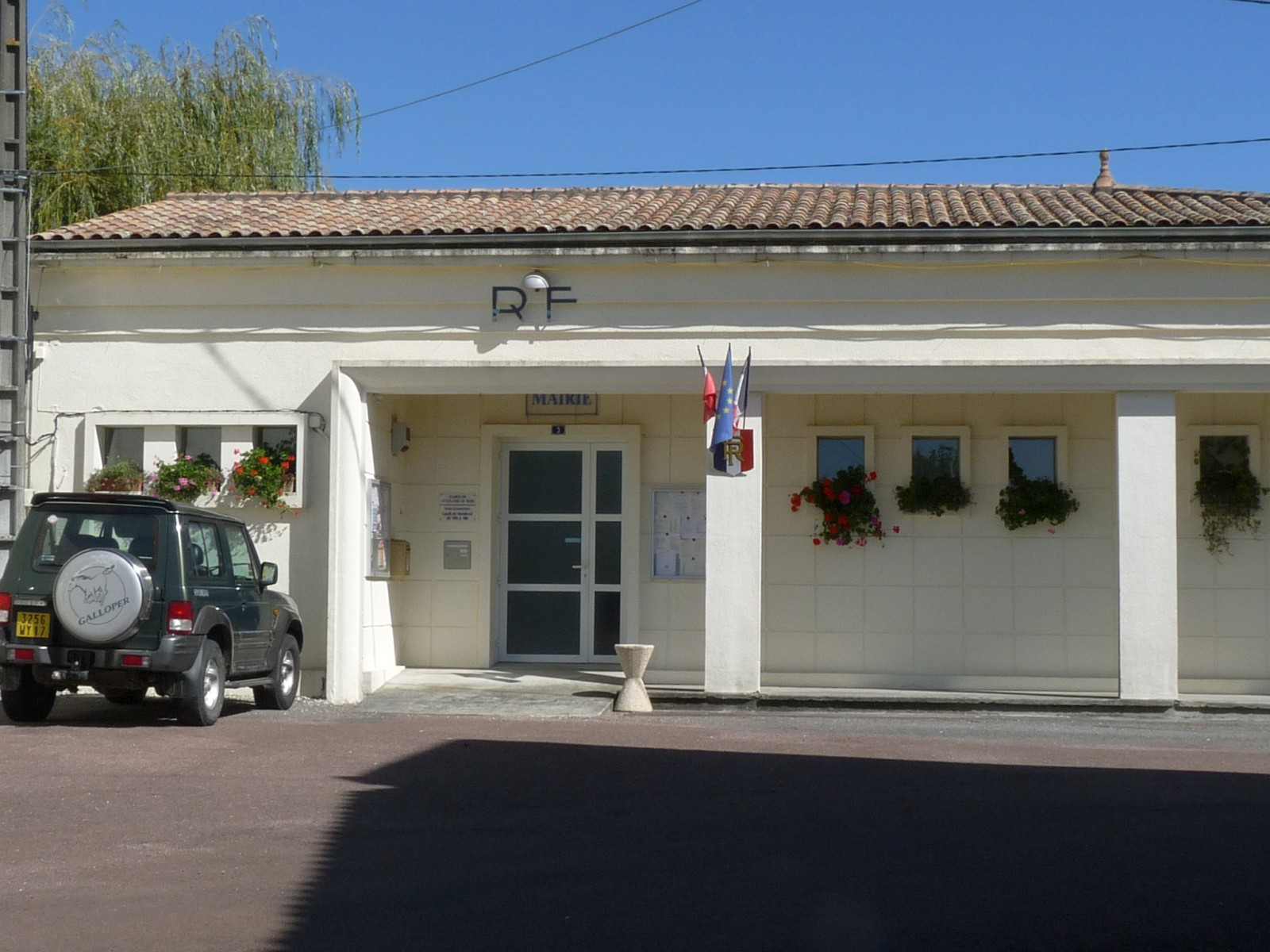
- The town hall in Saint-Hilaire-du-Bois
- Location of Saint-Hilaire-du-Bois
- Location within France Location within Nouvelle-Aquitaine
- Coordinates: 45°25′05″N 0°29′40″W
- Country: France
- Region: Nouvelle-Aquitaine
- Department: Charente-Maritime
- Arrondissement: Jonzac
- Canton: Jonzac

Government
  - Mayor (2020–2026): Marie-Catherine Prévot
- Area^{1}: 7.48 km^{2} (2.89 sq mi)
- Highest elevation: 71 m (233 ft)
- Lowest elevation: 29 m (95 ft)
- Population (2023): 294
  - Density: 39.3/km^{2} (102/sq mi)
- Time zone: UTC+01:00 (CET)
  - Summer (DST): UTC+02:00 (CEST)
- INSEE/Postal code: 17345 /17500
- ^{1} French Land Register data, which excludes lakes, ponds, glaciers > 1 km^{2} (0.386 sq mi or 247 acres) and river estuaries.

Saint-Hilaire-du-Bois (pronounced [sɛ̃t‿ilɛːʁ dy bwɑ]) is a commune in the Charente-Maritime department in the Nouvelle-Aquitaine region in southwestern France.

== Population ==
Historical population
| Year | Pop. | ±% p.a. |
|---|---|---|
| 1968 | 197 | — |
| 1975 | 192 | −0.37% |
| 1982 | 195 | +0.22% |
| 1990 | 273 | +4.30% |
| 1999 | 281 | +0.32% |
| 2007 | 279 | −0.09% |
| 2012 | 302 | +1.60% |
| 2017 | 332 | +1.91% |
| 2023 | 294 | −2.01% |
Source: INSEE

== See also ==
- Communes of the Charente-Maritime department
