= Saint-Martial-de-Vitaterne =

- Commune
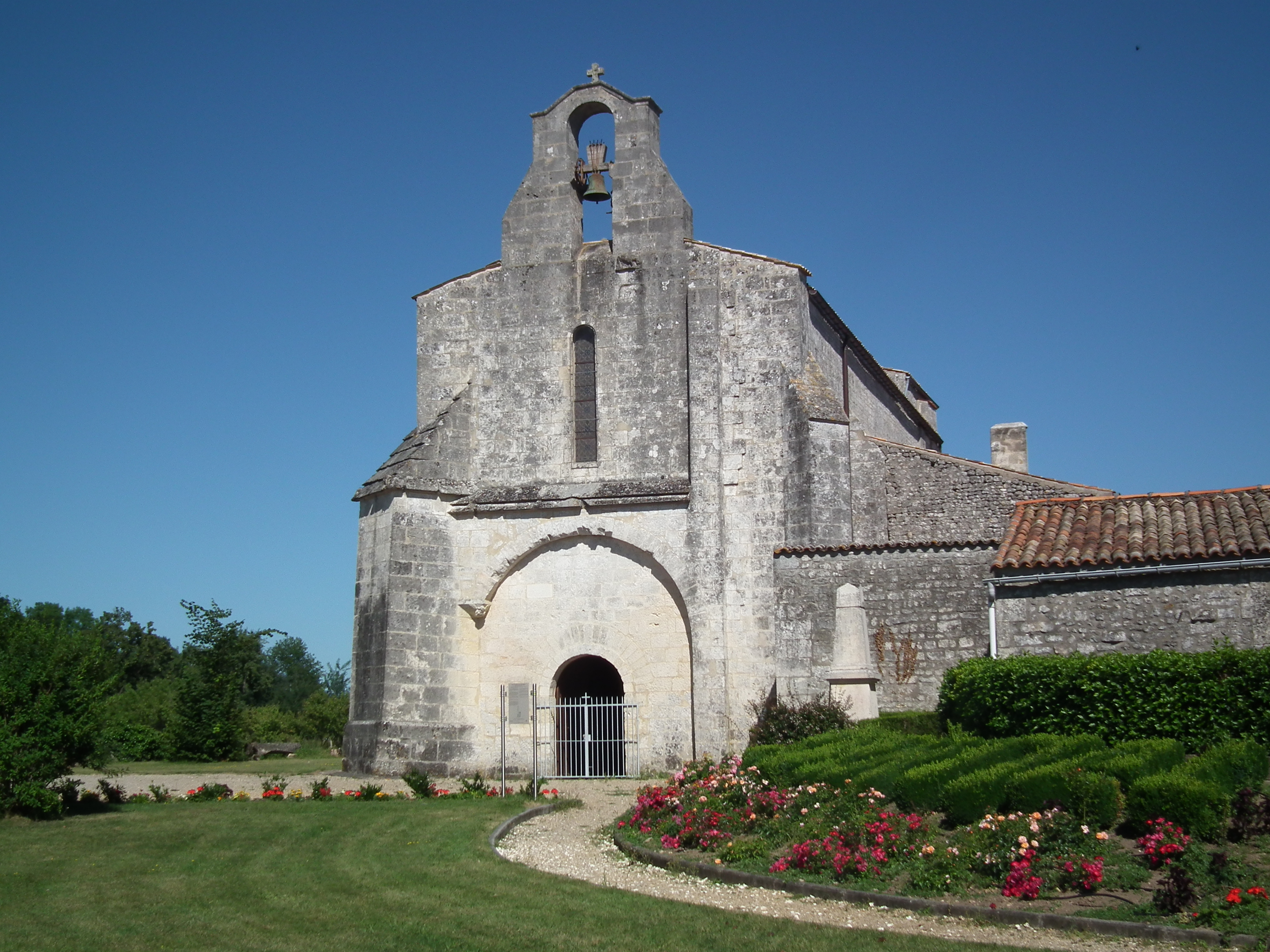
- The church in Saint-Martial-de-Vitaterne
- Location of Saint-Martial-de-Vitaterne
- Location within France Location within Nouvelle-Aquitaine
- Coordinates: 45°27′42″N 0°25′54″W
- Country: France
- Region: Nouvelle-Aquitaine
- Department: Charente-Maritime
- Arrondissement: Jonzac
- Canton: Jonzac

Government
  - Mayor (2020–2026): Joël Chaussereau
- Area^{1}: 2.78 km^{2} (1.07 sq mi)
- Highest elevation: 87 m (285 ft)
- Lowest elevation: 39 m (128 ft)
- Population (2023): 552
  - Density: 199/km^{2} (514/sq mi)
- Time zone: UTC+01:00 (CET)
  - Summer (DST): UTC+02:00 (CEST)
- INSEE/Postal code: 17363 /17500
- ^{1} French Land Register data, which excludes lakes, ponds, glaciers > 1 km^{2} (0.386 sq mi or 247 acres) and river estuaries.

Saint-Martial-de-Vitaterne (French pronunciation: [sɛ̃ maʁsjal də vitatɛʁn]) is a commune in the Charente-Maritime department in the Nouvelle-Aquitaine region in southwestern France.

== Population ==
Historical population
Year	Pop.	±% p.a.
1968	200	—
1975	442	+12.00%
1982	503	+1.86%
1990	419	−2.26%
1999	358	−1.73%
2007	459	+3.16%
2012	554	+3.83%
2017	548	−0.22%
2023	552	+0.12%
Source: INSEE

== See also ==
- Communes of the Charente-Maritime department
