= Mortiers, Charente-Maritime =

Mortiers
- Commune
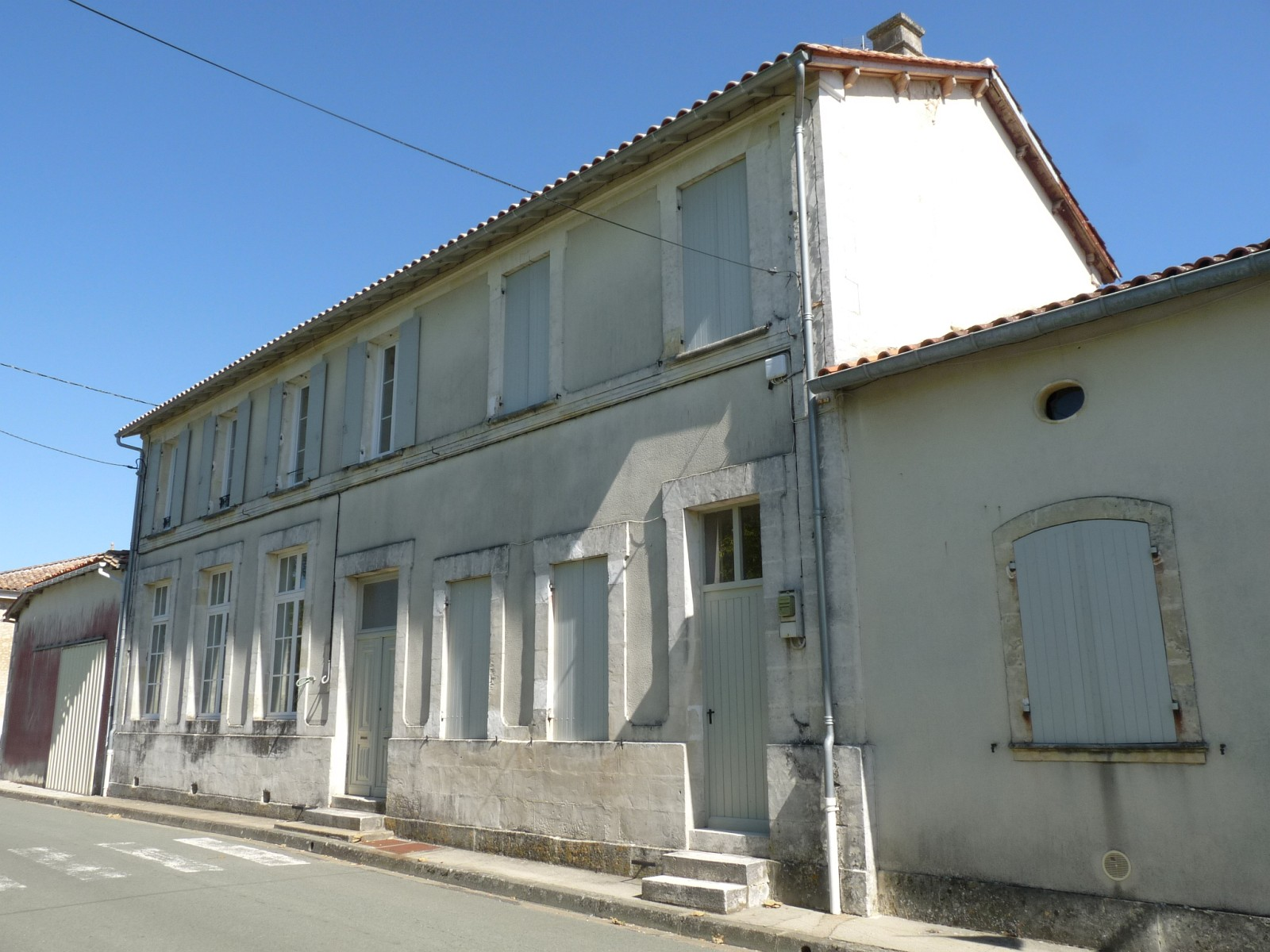
- The old town hall in Mortiers
- Location of Mortiers
- Location within France Location within Nouvelle-Aquitaine
- Coordinates: 45°24′11″N 0°19′18″W
- Country: France
- Region: Nouvelle-Aquitaine
- Department: Charente-Maritime
- Arrondissement: Jonzac
- Canton: Jonzac

Government
  - Mayor (2020–2026): Antony Letourneau
- Area^{1}: 6.53 km^{2} (2.52 sq mi)
- Highest elevation: 102 m (335 ft)
- Lowest elevation: 42 m (138 ft)
- Population (2023): 173
  - Density: 26.5/km^{2} (68.6/sq mi)
- Time zone: UTC+01:00 (CET)
  - Summer (DST): UTC+02:00 (CEST)
- INSEE/Postal code: 17249 /17500
- ^{1} French Land Register data, which excludes lakes, ponds, glaciers > 1 km^{2} (0.386 sq mi or 247 acres) and river estuaries.

Mortiers (French pronunciation: [mɔʁtje]) is a commune in the Charente-Maritime department in the Nouvelle-Aquitaine region in southwestern France.

== Population ==
Historical population
Year	Pop.	±% p.a.
1968	242	—
1975	230	−0.72%
1982	205	−1.63%
1990	184	−1.34%
1999	191	+0.42%
2007	189	−0.13%
2012	191	+0.21%
2017	186	−0.53%
2023	173	−1.20%
Source: INSEE

== See also ==
- Communes of the Charente-Maritime department
