= Saint-Simon-de-Bordes =

- Commune
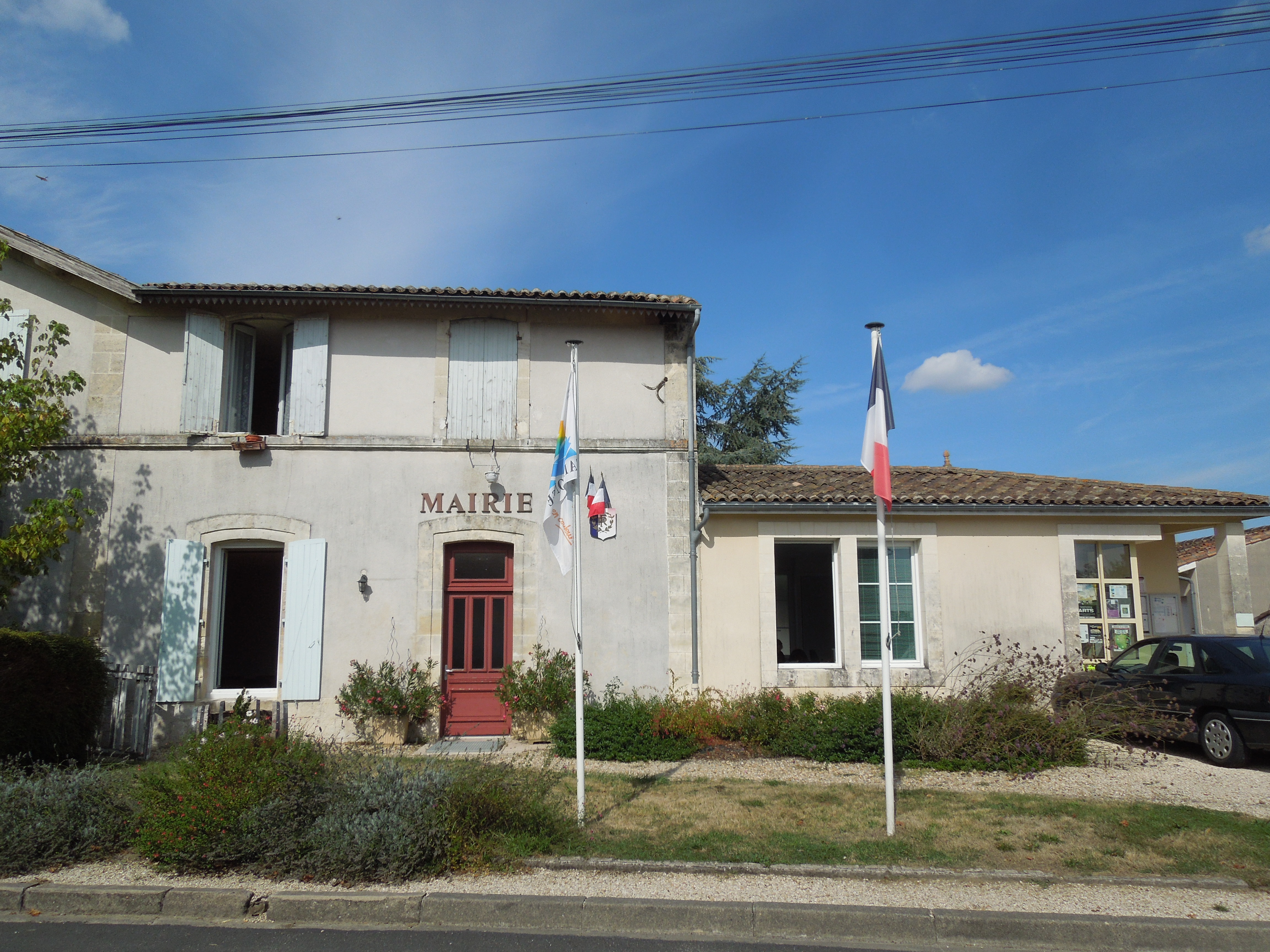
- The town hall in Saint-Simon-de-Bordes
- Location of Saint-Simon-de-Bordes
- Location within France Location within Nouvelle-Aquitaine
- Coordinates: 45°23′46″N 0°27′08″W
- Country: France
- Region: Nouvelle-Aquitaine
- Department: Charente-Maritime
- Arrondissement: Jonzac
- Canton: Jonzac

Government
  - Mayor (2020–2026): Jean-Marc Thomas
- Area^{1}: 14.08 km^{2} (5.44 sq mi)
- Highest elevation: 82 m (269 ft)
- Lowest elevation: 35 m (115 ft)
- Population (2023): 762
  - Density: 54.1/km^{2} (140/sq mi)
- Time zone: UTC+01:00 (CET)
  - Summer (DST): UTC+02:00 (CEST)
- INSEE/Postal code: 17403 /17500
- ^{1} French Land Register data, which excludes lakes, ponds, glaciers > 1 km^{2} (0.386 sq mi or 247 acres) and river estuaries.

Saint-Simon-de-Bordes (French pronunciation: [sɛ̃ simɔ̃ də bɔʁd]) is a commune in the Charente-Maritime department in the Nouvelle-Aquitaine region in southwestern France.

== Population ==
Historical population
Year	Pop.	±% p.a.
1968	503	—
1975	559	+1.52%
1982	572	+0.33%
1990	648	+1.57%
1999	621	−0.47%
2007	664	+0.84%
2012	711	+1.38%
2017	734	+0.64%
2023	762	+0.63%
Source: INSEE

== See also ==
- Communes of the Charente-Maritime department
