= Guitinières =

- Commune
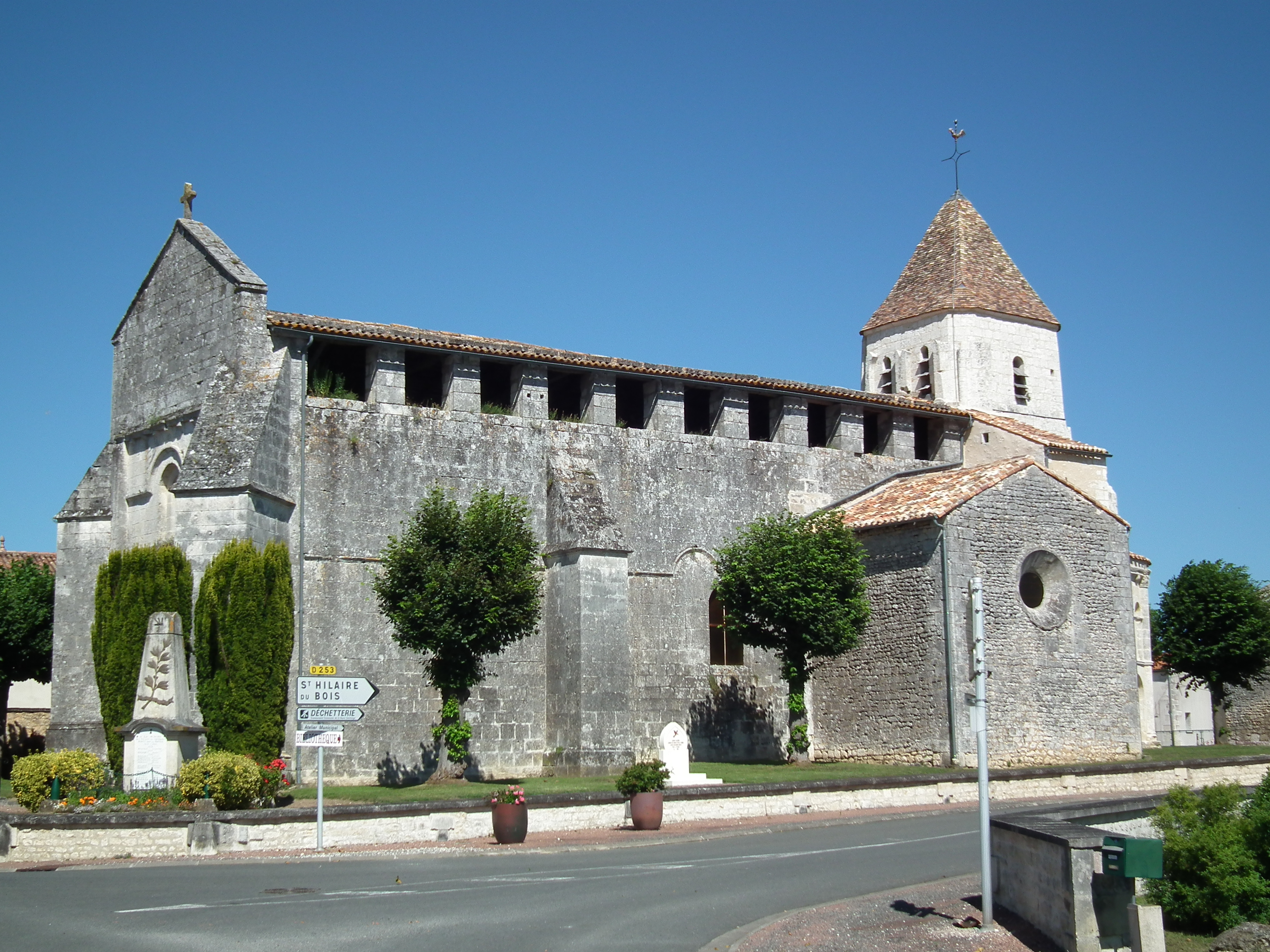
- The church in Guitinières
- Location of Guitinières
- Location within France Location within Nouvelle-Aquitaine
- Coordinates: 45°26′32″N 0°30′33″W
- Country: France
- Region: Nouvelle-Aquitaine
- Department: Charente-Maritime
- Arrondissement: Jonzac
- Canton: Jonzac

Government
  - Mayor (2020–2026): Jean-Philippe Potier
- Area^{1}: 9.18 km^{2} (3.54 sq mi)
- Highest elevation: 66 m (217 ft)
- Lowest elevation: 27 m (89 ft)
- Population (2023): 479
  - Density: 52.2/km^{2} (135/sq mi)
- Time zone: UTC+01:00 (CET)
  - Summer (DST): UTC+02:00 (CEST)
- INSEE/Postal code: 17187 /17500
- ^{1} French Land Register data, which excludes lakes, ponds, glaciers > 1 km^{2} (0.386 sq mi or 247 acres) and river estuaries.

Guitinières (French pronunciation: [ɡitinjɛʁ]) is a commune in the Charente-Maritime department in southwestern France.

== Population ==
Historical population
Year	Pop.	±% p.a.
1968	371	—
1975	378	+0.27%
1982	327	−2.05%
1990	343	+0.60%
1999	371	+0.88%
2007	409	+1.23%
2012	444	+1.66%
2017	542	+4.07%
2023	479	−2.04%
Source: INSEE

== See also ==
- Communes of the Charente-Maritime department
