= Cierzac =

- Commune
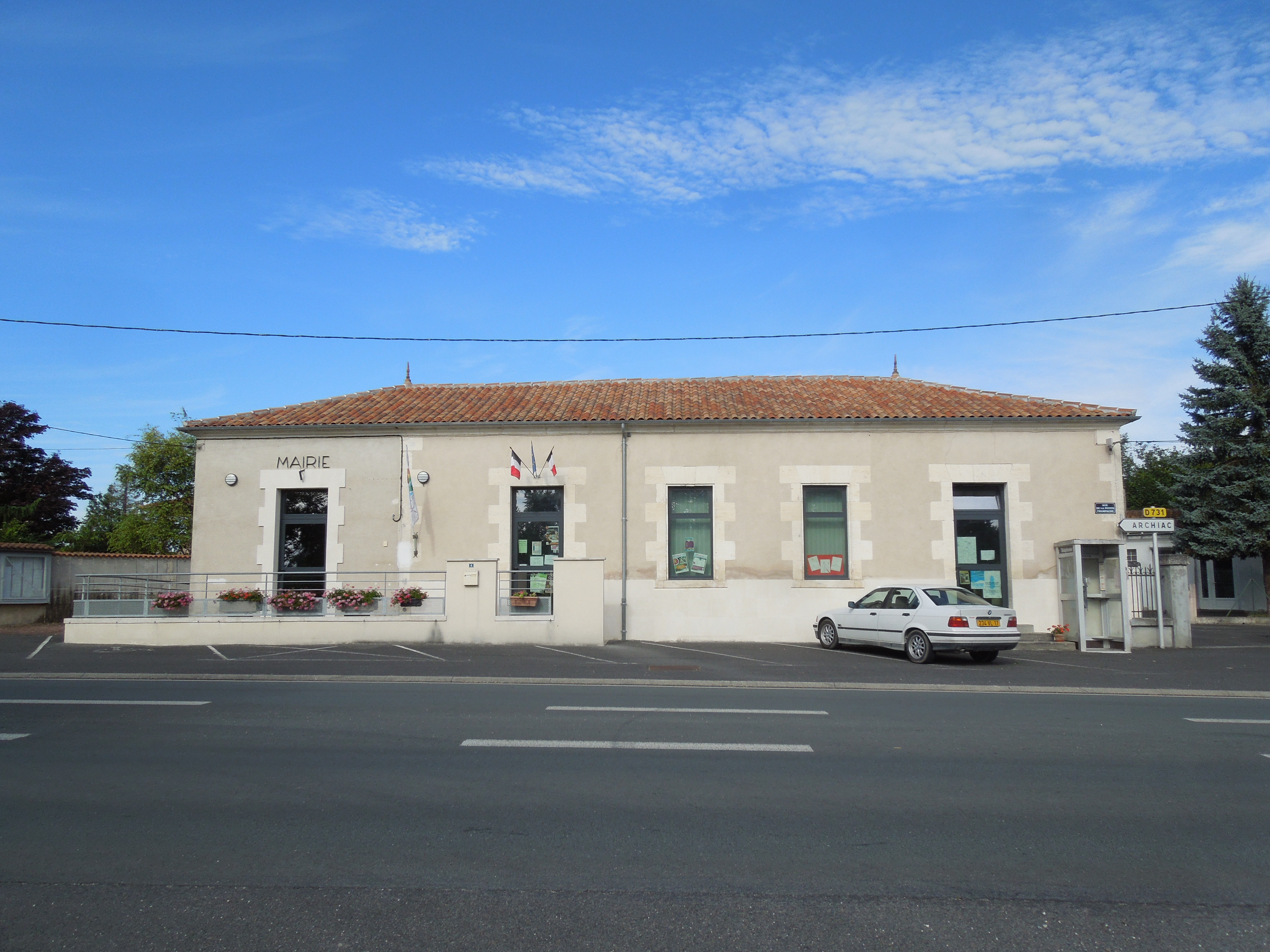
- The town hall in Cierzac
- Location of Cierzac
- Location within France Location within Nouvelle-Aquitaine
- Coordinates: 45°34′12″N 0°18′41″W
- Country: France
- Region: Nouvelle-Aquitaine
- Department: Charente-Maritime
- Arrondissement: Jonzac
- Canton: Jonzac

Government
  - Mayor (2020–2026): Laurent Bigey
- Area^{1}: 5.2 km^{2} (2.0 sq mi)
- Elevation: 27 m (89 ft)
- Highest elevation: 49 m (161 ft)
- Lowest elevation: 18 m (59 ft)
- Population (2023): 323
  - Density: 62/km^{2} (160/sq mi)
- Time zone: UTC+01:00 (CET)
  - Summer (DST): UTC+02:00 (CEST)
- INSEE/Postal code: 17106 /17520
- ^{1} French Land Register data, which excludes lakes, ponds, glaciers > 1 km^{2} (0.386 sq mi or 247 acres) and river estuaries.

Cierzac (French pronunciation: [sjɛʁzak]) is a commune in the Charente-Maritime department in the Nouvelle-Aquitaine region in southwestern France.

== Population ==
Historical population
Year	Pop.	±% p.a.
1968	221	—
1975	209	−0.79%
1982	177	−2.35%
1990	183	+0.42%
1999	199	+0.94%
2007	226	+1.60%
2012	271	+3.70%
2017	307	+2.53%
2023	323	+0.85%
Source: INSEE

== See also ==
- Communes of the Charente-Maritime department
