= Canton of Jonzac =

Coordinates: 45°26′N 0°23′W

Jonzac
- Canton
- Interactive map of Jonzac
- Country: France
- Region: Nouvelle-Aquitaine
- Department: Charente-Maritime
- No. of communes: {{{nbcomm}}}
- Area: 460.68 km^{2} (177.87 sq mi)
- Population (2023): 20,778
  - Density: 45.103/km^{2} (116.82/sq mi)
- INSEE code: 1707

The Canton of Jonzac is a canton of the Charente-Maritime département, in France. At the French canton reorganisation which came into effect in March 2015, the canton was expanded from 20 to 46 communes (3 of which merged into the new commune Réaux-sur-Trèfle):

- Agudelle
- Allas-Bocage
- Allas-Champagne
- Archiac
- Arthenac
- Brie-sous-Archiac
- Celles
- Champagnac
- Chaunac
- Cierzac
- Clam
- Clion
- Consac
- Fontaines-d'Ozillac
- Germignac
- Guitinières
- Jarnac-Champagne
- Jonzac
- Léoville
- Lonzac
- Lussac
- Meux
- Mortiers
- Neuillac
- Neulles
- Nieul-le-Virouil
- Ozillac
- Réaux-sur-Trèfle
- Saint-Ciers-Champagne
- Saint-Dizant-du-Bois
- Sainte-Lheurine
- Saint-Eugène
- Saint-Georges-Antignac
- Saint-Germain-de-Lusignan
- Saint-Germain-de-Vibrac
- Saint-Hilaire-du-Bois
- Saint-Maigrin
- Saint-Martial-de-Vitaterne
- Saint-Martial-sur-Né
- Saint-Médard
- Saint-Sigismond-de-Clermont
- Saint-Simon-de-Bordes
- Vibrac
- Villexavier

== Population history ==
Historical population
Year	Pop.	±% p.a.
2013	20,627	—
2018	20,591	−0.03%
Source: INSEE

== See also ==
- Charente-Maritime
- Arrondissements of the Charente-Maritime department
- Cantons of the Charente-Maritime department
- Communes of the Charente-Maritime department
