= Germignac =

- Commune
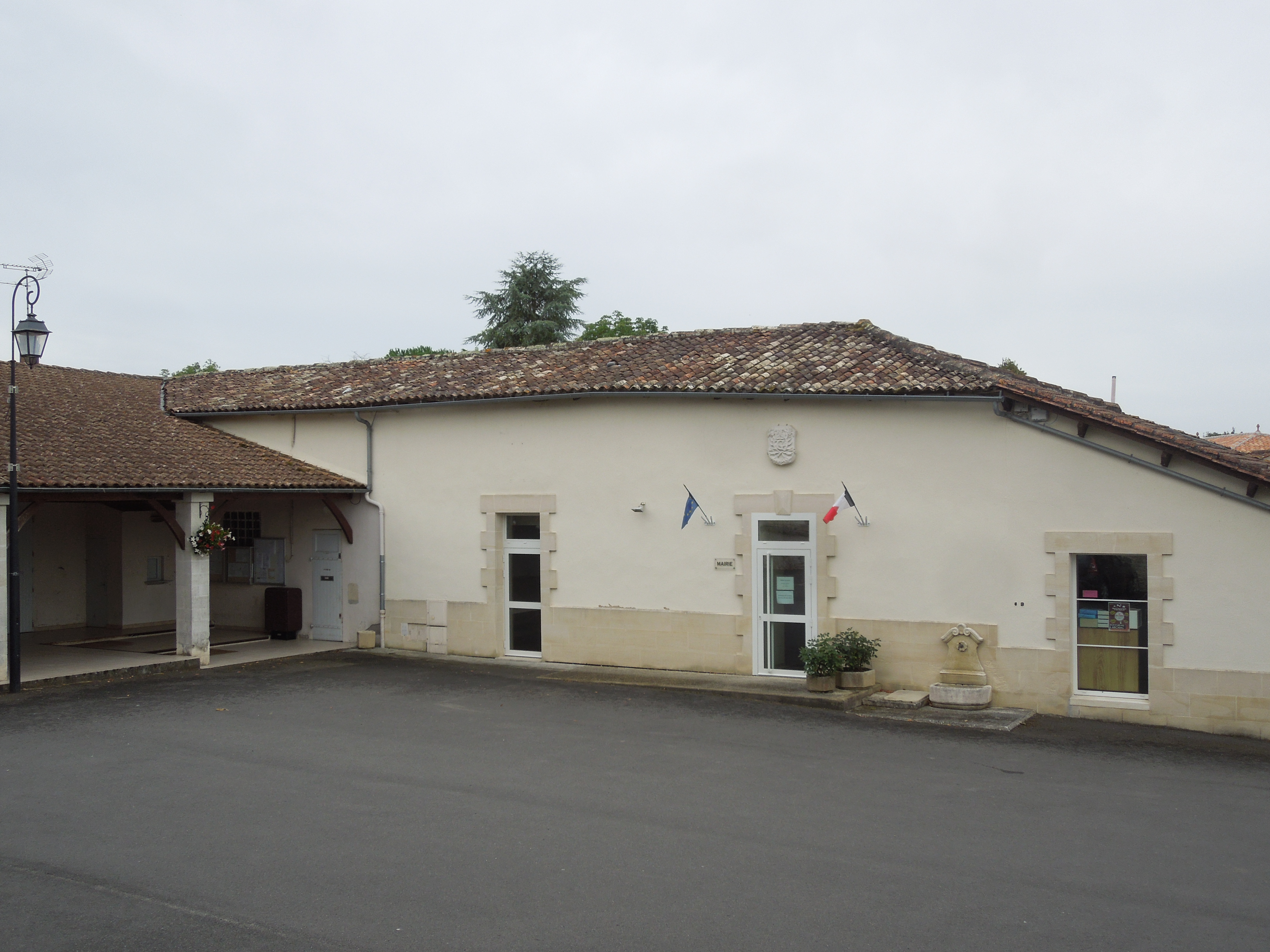
- The town hall in Germignac

- Coat of arms
- Location of Germignac
- Location within France Location within Nouvelle-Aquitaine
- Coordinates: 45°34′24″N 0°20′12″W
- Country: France
- Region: Nouvelle-Aquitaine
- Department: Charente-Maritime
- Arrondissement: Jonzac
- Canton: Jonzac
- Intercommunality: Haute-Saintonge

Government
  - Mayor (2020–2026): Daniel Rozot
- Area^{1}: 14.42 km^{2} (5.57 sq mi)
- Elevation: 37 m (121 ft)
- Highest elevation: 84 m (276 ft)
- Lowest elevation: 17 m (56 ft)
- Population (2023): 653
  - Density: 45.3/km^{2} (117/sq mi)
- Time zone: UTC+01:00 (CET)
  - Summer (DST): UTC+02:00 (CEST)
- INSEE/Postal code: 17175 /17520
- ^{1} French Land Register data, which excludes lakes, ponds, glaciers > 1 km^{2} (0.386 sq mi or 247 acres) and river estuaries.

Germignac (French pronunciation: [ʒɛʁmiɲak]) is a commune in the Charente-Maritime department in the Nouvelle-Aquitaine region in southwestern France.

== Population ==
Historical population
Year	Pop.	±% p.a.
1968	342	—
1975	336	−0.25%
1982	352	+0.67%
1990	539	+5.47%
1999	531	−0.17%
2007	586	+1.24%
2012	642	+1.84%
2017	651	+0.28%
2023	653	+0.05%
Source: INSEE

== See also ==
- Communes of the Charente-Maritime department
