= Sainte-Lheurine =

- Commune
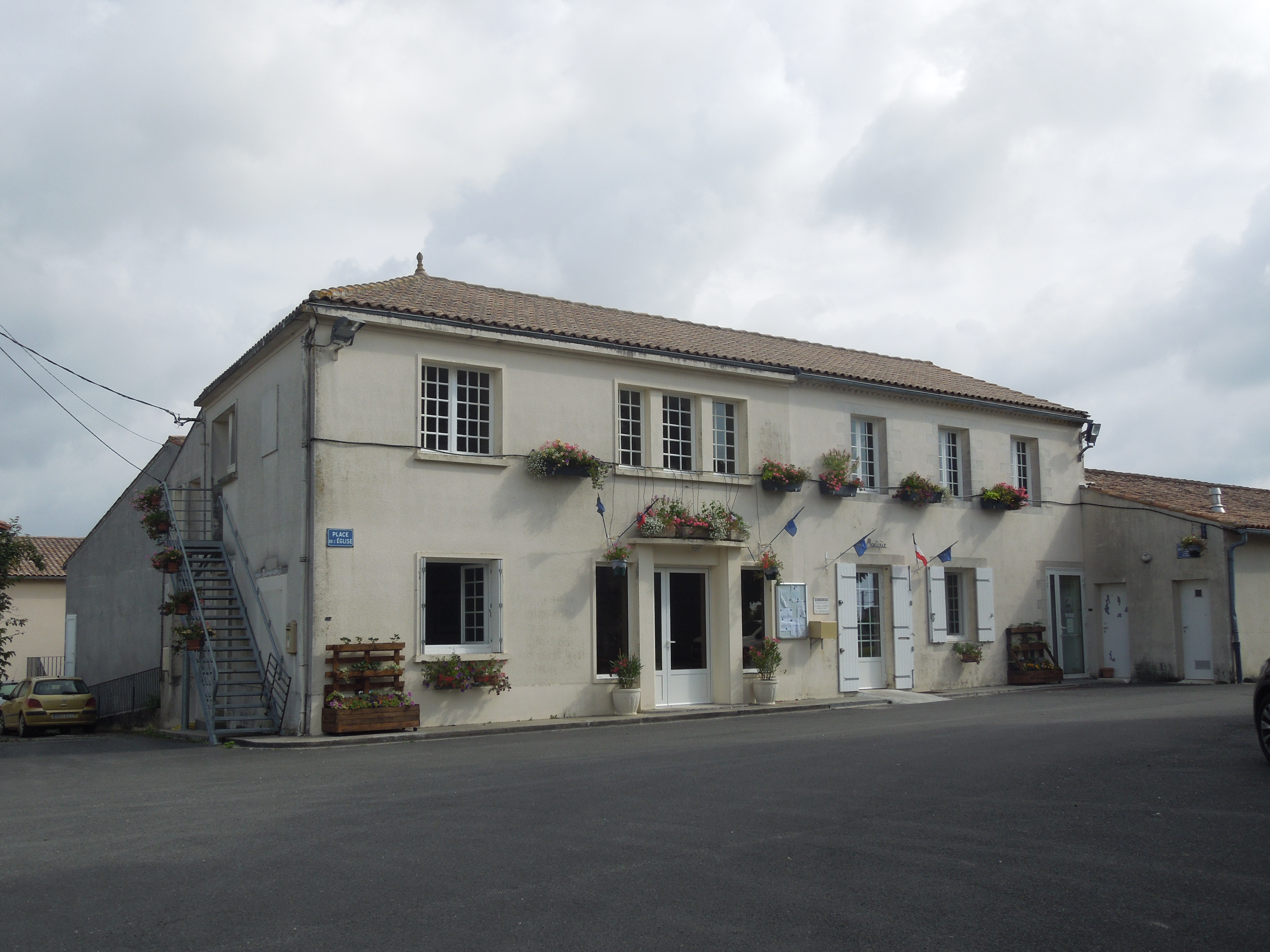
- The town hall in Sainte-Lheurine

- Coat of arms
- Location of Sainte-Lheurine
- Location within France Location within Nouvelle-Aquitaine
- Coordinates: 45°31′52″N 0°21′54″W
- Country: France
- Region: Nouvelle-Aquitaine
- Department: Charente-Maritime
- Arrondissement: Jonzac
- Canton: Jonzac

Government
  - Mayor (2020–2026): Jean-Pierre Mariau
- Area^{1}: 17.78 km^{2} (6.86 sq mi)
- Elevation: 106 m (348 ft)
- Highest elevation: 109 m (358 ft)
- Lowest elevation: 36 m (118 ft)
- Population (2023): 533
  - Density: 30.0/km^{2} (77.6/sq mi)
- Time zone: UTC+01:00 (CET)
  - Summer (DST): UTC+02:00 (CEST)
- INSEE/Postal code: 17355 /17520
- ^{1} French Land Register data, which excludes lakes, ponds, glaciers > 1 km^{2} (0.386 sq mi or 247 acres) and river estuaries.

Sainte-Lheurine (French pronunciation: [sɛ̃t lœʁin]) is a commune in the Charente-Maritime department in the Nouvelle-Aquitaine region in southwestern France.

== Location and economy ==
The village centre with its church from the 12th century is situated on a small hill that overlooks the vineyards, patches of forest, and the wheat, maize and sunflower fields that characterize the local landscape. A number of scattered small hamlets and single farmsteads in the plains below belong to the commune.

Sainte-Lheurine lies in the "Petite Champagne", and the cultivation of grapes for the production of Cognac and Pineau is the predominant local economic activity, with much of the production sold to the large cognac producers in nearby Cognac.

== Population ==
Historical population
| Year | Pop. | ±% p.a. |
|---|---|---|
| 1968 | 549 | — |
| 1975 | 510 | −1.05% |
| 1982 | 473 | −1.07% |
| 1990 | 476 | +0.08% |
| 1999 | 455 | −0.50% |
| 2007 | 461 | +0.16% |
| 2012 | 520 | +2.44% |
| 2017 | 512 | −0.31% |
| 2023 | 533 | +0.67% |
Source: INSEE

== See also ==
- Communes of the Charente-Maritime department
