= Saint-Ciers-Champagne =

- Commune
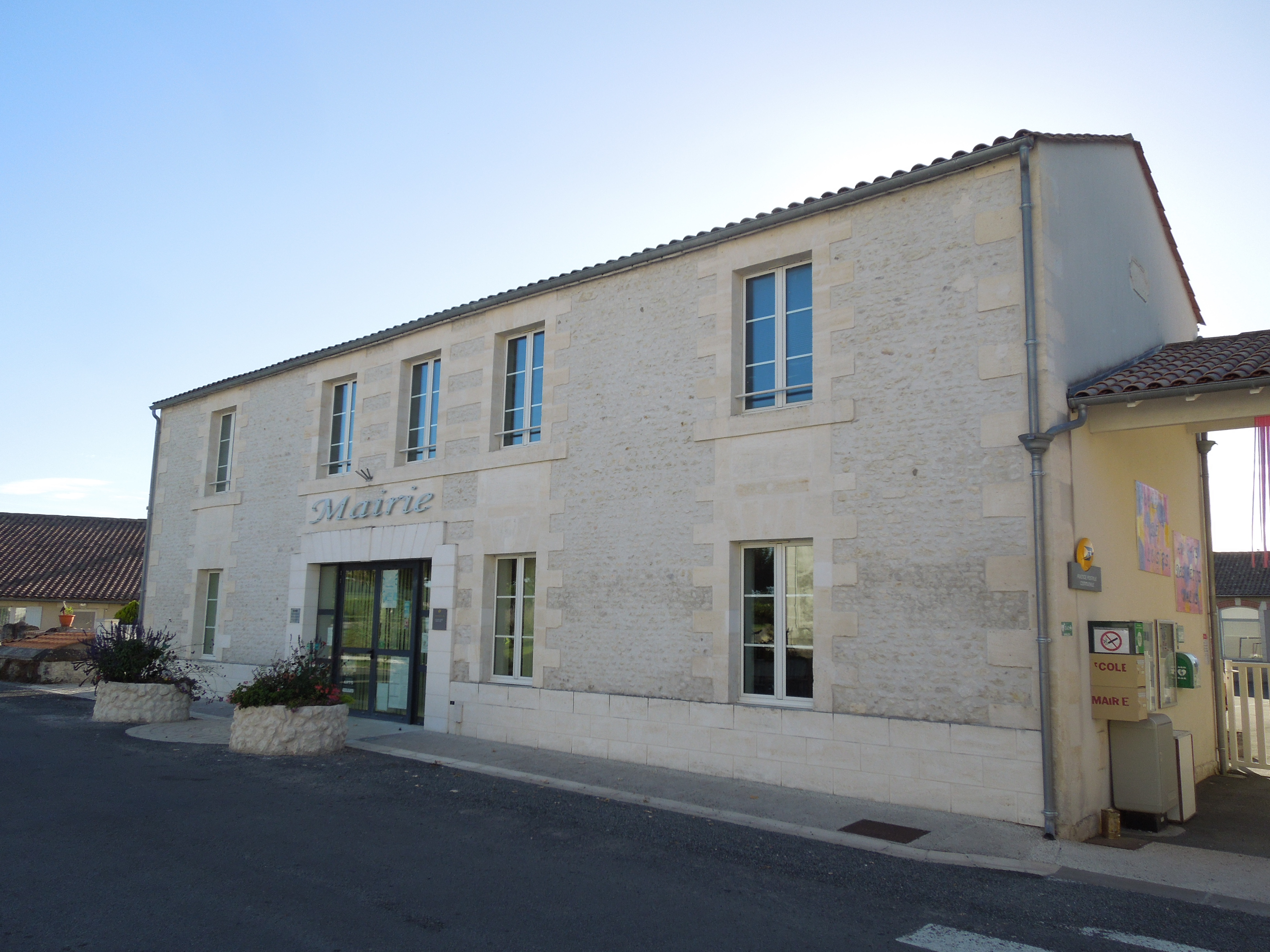
- The town hall in Saint-Ciers-Champagne
- Location of Saint-Ciers-Champagne
- Location within France Location within Nouvelle-Aquitaine
- Coordinates: 45°26′37″N 0°17′53″W
- Country: France
- Region: Nouvelle-Aquitaine
- Department: Charente-Maritime
- Arrondissement: Jonzac
- Canton: Jonzac

Government
  - Mayor (2020–2026): Michel Vion
- Area^{1}: 18.08 km^{2} (6.98 sq mi)
- Elevation: 49 m (161 ft)
- Highest elevation: 118 m (387 ft)
- Lowest elevation: 38 m (125 ft)
- Population (2023): 388
  - Density: 21.5/km^{2} (55.6/sq mi)
- Time zone: UTC+01:00 (CET)
  - Summer (DST): UTC+02:00 (CEST)
- INSEE/Postal code: 17316 /17520
- ^{1} French Land Register data, which excludes lakes, ponds, glaciers > 1 km^{2} (0.386 sq mi or 247 acres) and river estuaries.

Saint-Ciers-Champagne (French pronunciation: [sɛ̃ sje ʃɑ̃paɲ]) is a commune in the Charente-Maritime department in the Nouvelle-Aquitaine region in southwestern France.

== Population ==
Historical population
Year	Pop.	±% p.a.
1968	501	—
1975	406	−2.96%
1982	382	−0.87%
1990	375	−0.23%
1999	367	−0.24%
2007	364	−0.10%
2012	435	+3.63%
2017	416	−0.89%
2023	388	−1.15%
Source: INSEE

== See also ==
- Communes of the Charente-Maritime department
