= Lonzac =

- Commune
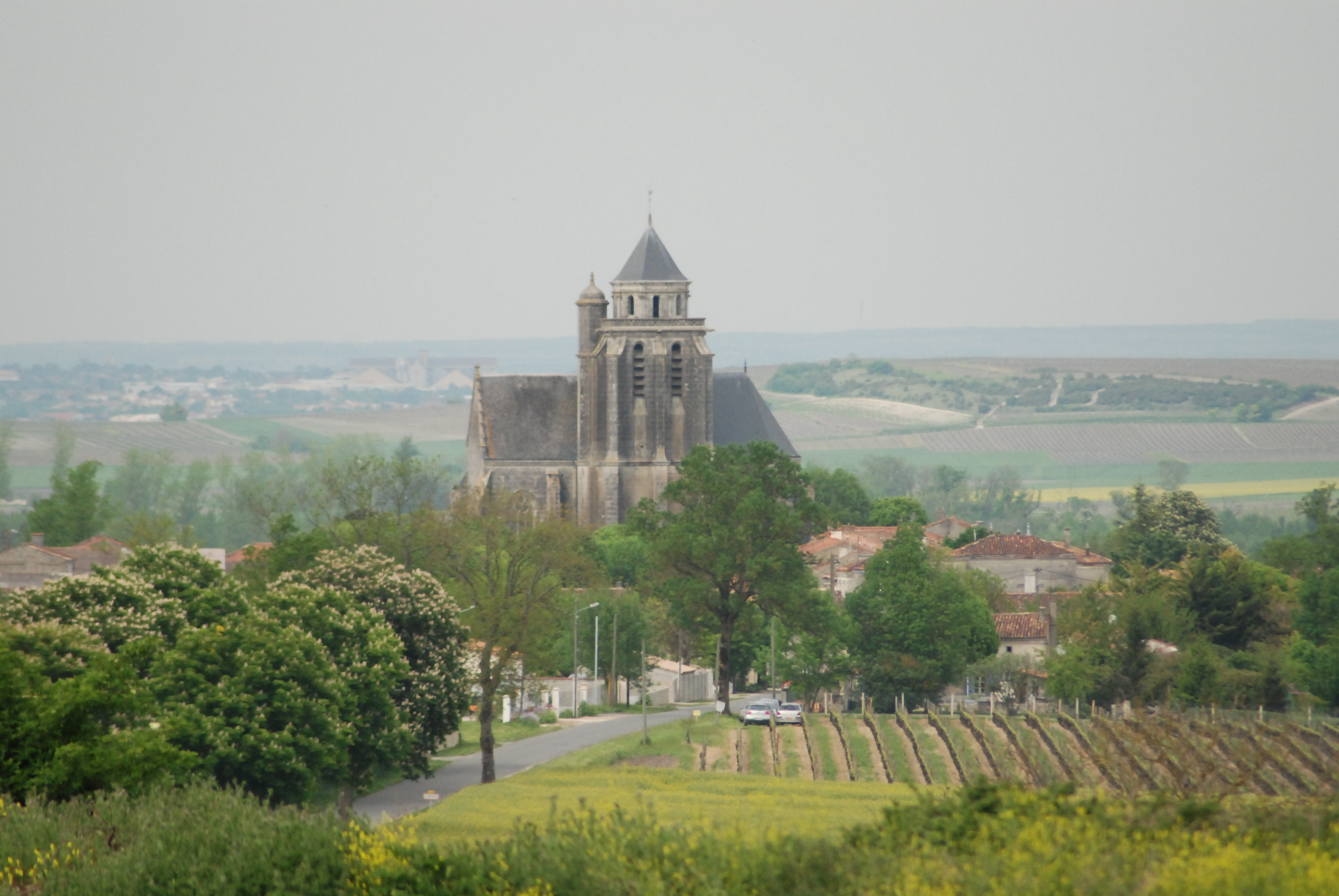
- The church in Lonzac
- Location of Lonzac
- Location within France Location within Nouvelle-Aquitaine
- Coordinates: 45°35′47″N 0°23′30″W
- Country: France
- Region: Nouvelle-Aquitaine
- Department: Charente-Maritime
- Arrondissement: Jonzac
- Canton: Jonzac

Government
  - Mayor (2023–2026): Paul Bergier
- Area^{1}: 6.24 km^{2} (2.41 sq mi)
- Elevation: 35 m (115 ft)
- Highest elevation: 80 m (260 ft)
- Lowest elevation: 19 m (62 ft)
- Population (2023): 267
  - Density: 42.8/km^{2} (111/sq mi)
- Time zone: UTC+01:00 (CET)
  - Summer (DST): UTC+02:00 (CEST)
- INSEE/Postal code: 17209 /17520
- ^{1} French Land Register data, which excludes lakes, ponds, glaciers > 1 km^{2} (0.386 sq mi or 247 acres) and river estuaries.

Lonzac (French pronunciation: [lɔ̃zak]) is a commune in the Charente-Maritime department in the Nouvelle-Aquitaine region in southwestern France.

== Population ==
Historical population
Year	Pop.	±% p.a.
1968	245	—
1975	242	−0.18%
1982	256	+0.81%
1990	244	−0.60%
1999	248	+0.18%
2007	239	−0.46%
2012	251	+0.98%
2017	271	+1.55%
2023	267	−0.25%
Source: INSEE

== See also ==
- Communes of the Charente-Maritime department
