= Brie-sous-Archiac =

- Commune
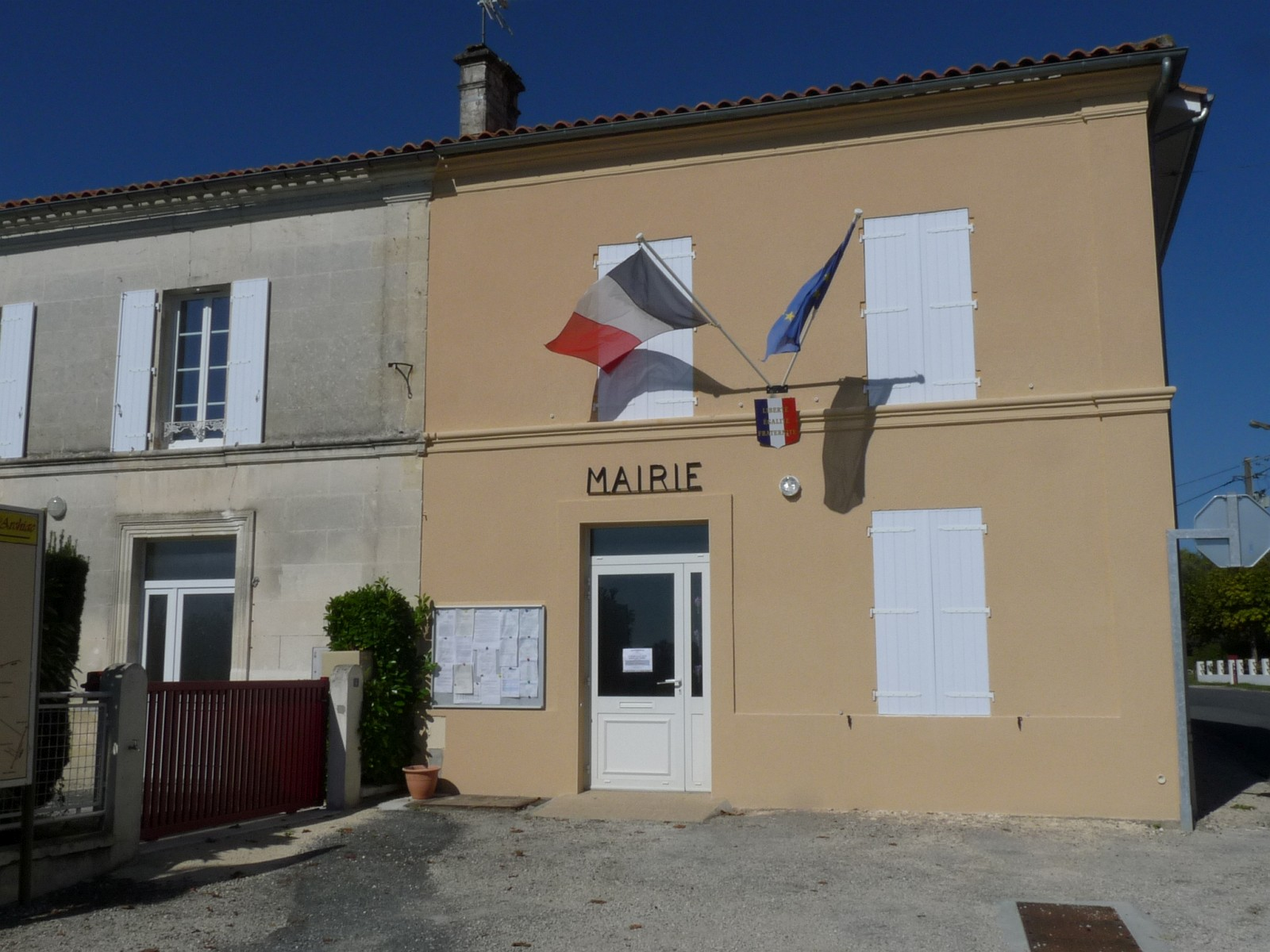
- The town hall in Brie-sous-Archiac

- Coat of arms
- Location of Brie-sous-Archiac
- Location within France Location within Nouvelle-Aquitaine
- Coordinates: 45°28′28″N 0°18′05″W
- Country: France
- Region: Nouvelle-Aquitaine
- Department: Charente-Maritime
- Arrondissement: Jonzac
- Canton: Jonzac

Government
  - Mayor (2020–2026): Alain Pozzobon
- Area^{1}: 7.49 km^{2} (2.89 sq mi)
- Elevation: 100 m (330 ft)
- Highest elevation: 113 m (371 ft)
- Lowest elevation: 49 m (161 ft)
- Population (2023): 223
  - Density: 29.8/km^{2} (77.1/sq mi)
- Time zone: UTC+01:00 (CET)
  - Summer (DST): UTC+02:00 (CEST)
- INSEE/Postal code: 17066 /17520
- ^{1} French Land Register data, which excludes lakes, ponds, glaciers > 1 km^{2} (0.386 sq mi or 247 acres) and river estuaries.

Brie-sous-Archiac (French pronunciation: [bʁi su.z‿aʁʃjak], literally Brie under Archiac) is a commune in the Charente-Maritime department in the Nouvelle-Aquitaine region in southwestern France.

== Population ==
Historical population
Year	Pop.	±% p.a.
1968	337	—
1975	312	−1.10%
1982	276	−1.74%
1990	275	−0.05%
1999	245	−1.28%
2007	232	−0.68%
2012	261	+2.38%
2017	241	−1.58%
2023	223	−1.29%
Source: INSEE

== See also ==
- Communes of the Charente-Maritime department
