= Saint-Maigrin =

- Commune
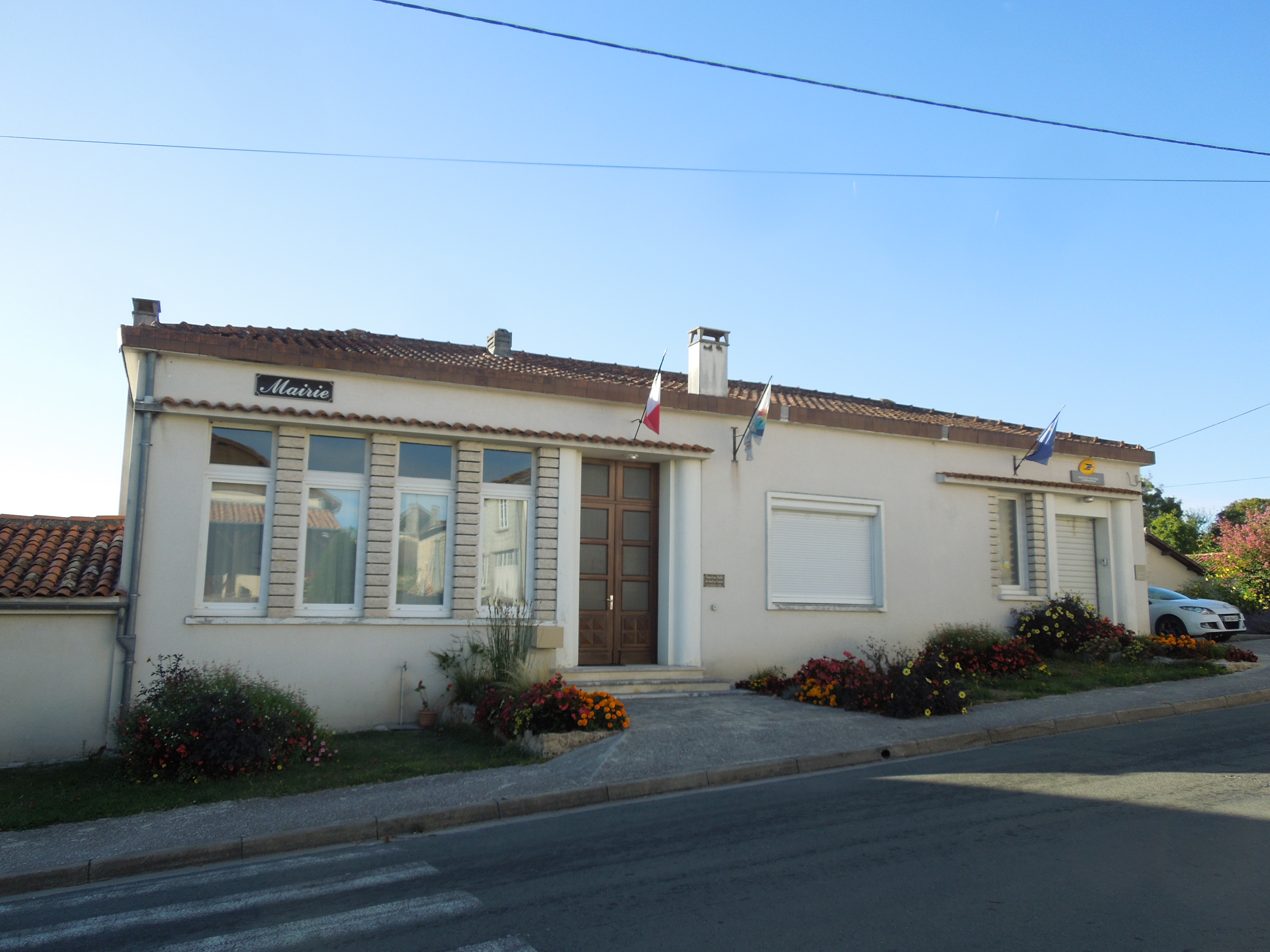
- The town hall in Saint-Maigrin
- Location of Saint-Maigrin
- Location within France Location within Nouvelle-Aquitaine
- Coordinates: 45°25′09″N 0°16′49″W
- Country: France
- Region: Nouvelle-Aquitaine
- Department: Charente-Maritime
- Arrondissement: Jonzac
- Canton: Jonzac

Government
  - Mayor (2020–2026): Laurence Bourdézeau
- Area^{1}: 21.49 km^{2} (8.30 sq mi)
- Elevation: 80 m (260 ft)
- Highest elevation: 118 m (387 ft)
- Lowest elevation: 51 m (167 ft)
- Population (2023): 534
  - Density: 24.8/km^{2} (64.4/sq mi)
- Time zone: UTC+01:00 (CET)
  - Summer (DST): UTC+02:00 (CEST)
- INSEE/Postal code: 17357 /17520
- ^{1} French Land Register data, which excludes lakes, ponds, glaciers > 1 km^{2} (0.386 sq mi or 247 acres) and river estuaries.

Saint-Maigrin (French pronunciation: [sɛ̃ mɛɡʁɛ̃]) is a commune in the Charente-Maritime department in the Nouvelle-Aquitaine region in southwestern France.

== Population ==
Historical population
Year	Pop.	±% p.a.
1968	598	—
1975	555	−1.06%
1982	548	−0.18%
1990	511	−0.87%
1999	526	+0.32%
2007	553	+0.63%
2012	560	+0.25%
2017	531	−1.06%
2023	534	+0.09%
Source: INSEE

== See also ==
- Communes of the Charente-Maritime department
