= Nieul-le-Virouil =

- Commune
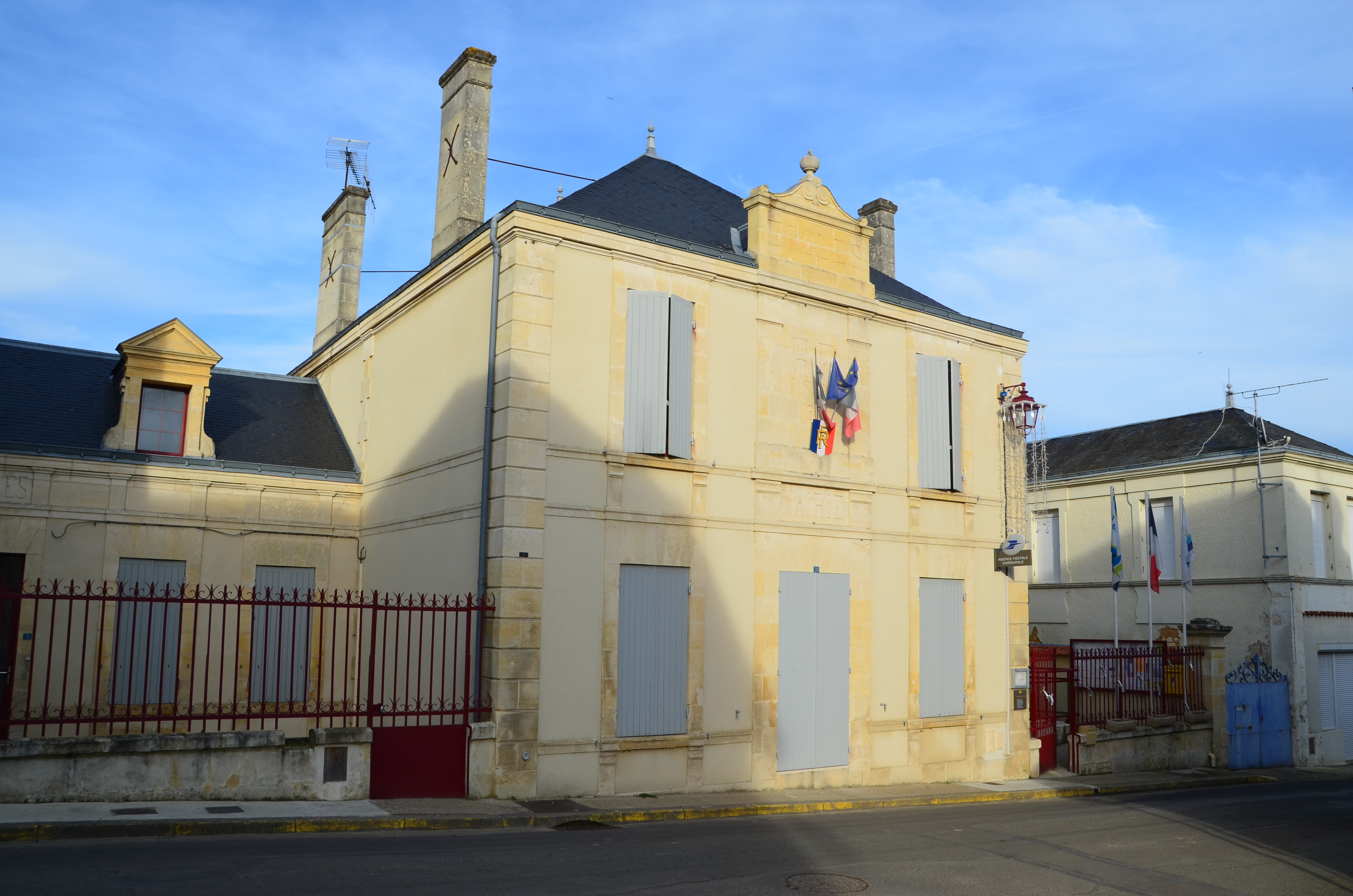
- The town hall in Nieul-le-Virouil
- Location of Nieul-le-Virouil
- Location within France Location within Nouvelle-Aquitaine
- Coordinates: 45°24′33″N 0°31′46″W
- Country: France
- Region: Nouvelle-Aquitaine
- Department: Charente-Maritime
- Arrondissement: Jonzac
- Canton: Jonzac

Government
  - Mayor (2020–2026): Christophe Pavie
- Area^{1}: 22.64 km^{2} (8.74 sq mi)
- Highest elevation: 80 m (260 ft)
- Lowest elevation: 28 m (92 ft)
- Population (2023): 573
  - Density: 25.3/km^{2} (65.6/sq mi)
- Time zone: UTC+01:00 (CET)
  - Summer (DST): UTC+02:00 (CEST)
- INSEE/Postal code: 17263 /17150
- ^{1} French Land Register data, which excludes lakes, ponds, glaciers > 1 km^{2} (0.386 sq mi or 247 acres) and river estuaries.

Nieul-le-Virouil (French pronunciation: [njœl lə viʁuj]) is a commune in the Charente-Maritime department in southwestern France.

== Population ==
Historical population
Year	Pop.	±% p.a.
1968	660	—
1975	577	−1.90%
1982	530	−1.21%
1990	547	+0.40%
1999	562	+0.30%
2007	571	+0.20%
2012	592	+0.72%
2017	578	−0.48%
2023	573	−0.14%
Source: INSEE

== See also ==
- Communes of the Charente-Maritime department
