= Kop Hill Climb =

Hillclimb in Buckinghamshire, UK

Kop Hill
- Location: Princes Risborough, Buckinghamshire, England
- Time zone: GMT
- Opened: 1910
- Hill Length: 903 yards (826 m)
- Hill Record: 26.8 (Louis Zborowski, 1922)

The Kop Hill Climb is a hillclimb in Princes Risborough, Buckinghamshire. The climb was originally established in 1910 but due to a minor accident involving a spectator on the public road that formed the hillclimb, the last competitive event was held on 28 March 1925. The Royal Automobile Club then banned all motorsport on public roads, making the Kop Hill Climb the last of its kind to be run on the public highways in the UK. Since 2009 Kop Hill has been the focus of an annual revival run as a non-competitive, charity event.

== Technical ==
The climb is 903 yards (826 m) long. It takes part on a public road with a 1:6 gradient leading to 1:5 with a short 1:4 at its steepest at the top of the climb.

== The original Kop Hill Climb event ==
Kop Hill in its original, competitive form became a major event on the motor sports car and motorcycle calendar and many famous drivers and riders took part in the early years including Malcolm Campbell (Talbot 12 hp "Blue Bird"), Raymond Mays (Bugatti), Henry Segrave (Sunbeam 2-litre Grand Prix) Archibald Frazer-Nash (KimII) J G Parry-Thomas (Leyland) and Capt.J E P Howey (Leyland). Motorsport racing on public roads was banned in Great Britain in 1925 due to an accident at the Kop Hill Climb event, when an automobile left the road and ran over a spectator, breaking his leg. The Royal Automobile Club (R.A.C.) and the Auto-Cycle Union (A.C.U.) announced that they would issue no further permits for speed competitions on public roads "for the present" however, their ban was never lifted.

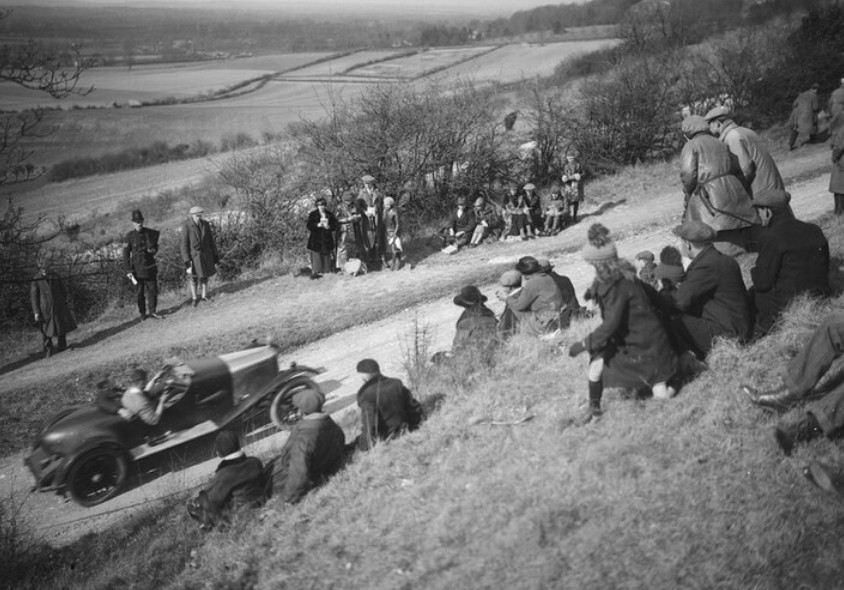
Bertie Kensington-Moir in Aston Martin, 1922

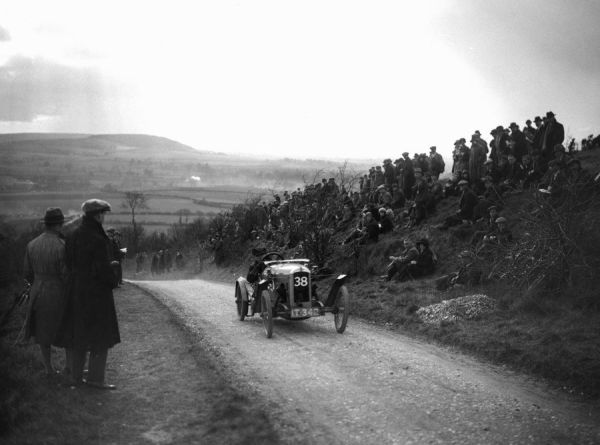
Henry Ronald Godfrey in GN (car), 1922

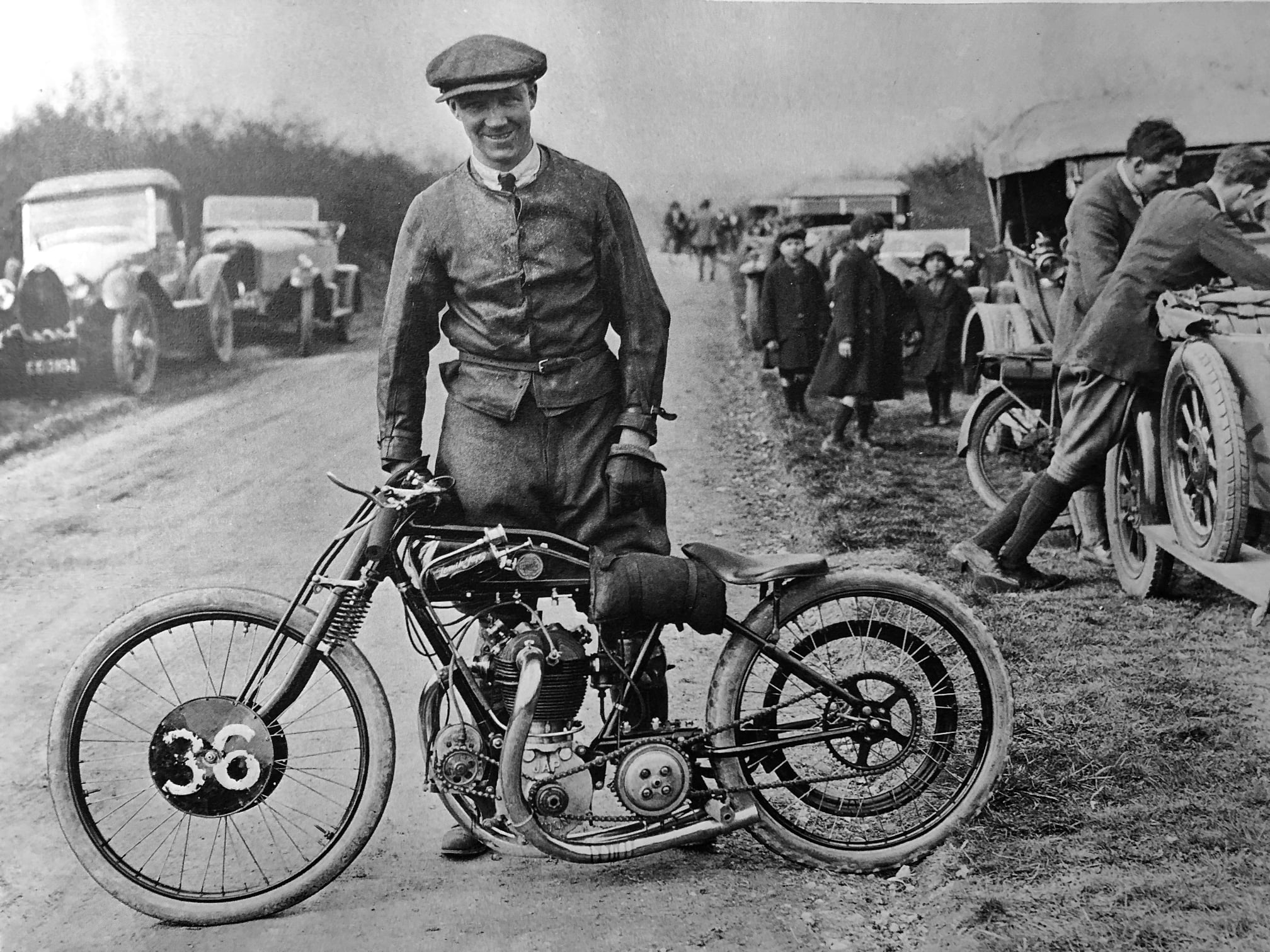
Bert le Vack, 1923

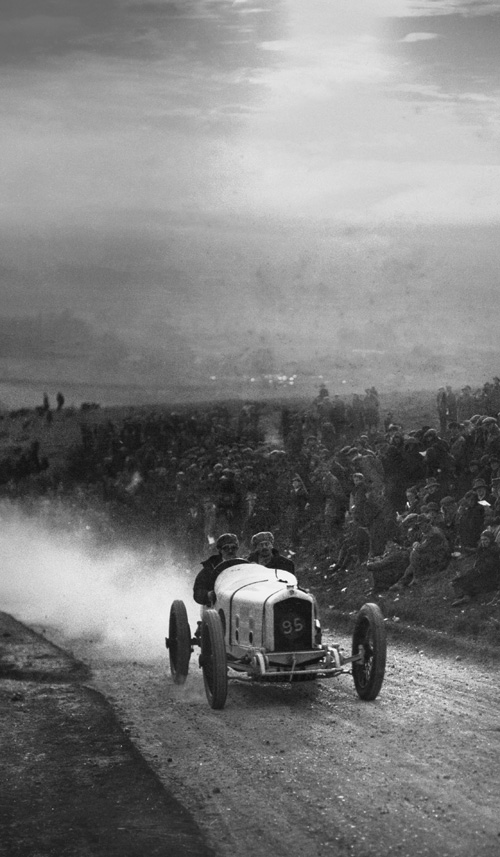
Louis Zborowski, 1922 (or 1924)

== The Kop Hill Climb revival ==
The hillclimb was initially revived in 1999 by the Town Council and the Bean Car Club as part of the Risborough Festival, and has become an annual event again. Today's revival was kicked off in 2009 and is run along non-competitive lines, to showcase cars and bikes dating back to the competitive era as well as more modern cars of interest and heritage. The event was run by Kop Hill Climb Ltd, which was dissolved in May 2017 and is now run by Buckinghamshire Community Foundation (Kop Hill Climb) Limited with unpaid volunteers managing the event for the Buckinghamshire Community Foundation raising money for local charities; by 2022, the event had raised over £870,000.

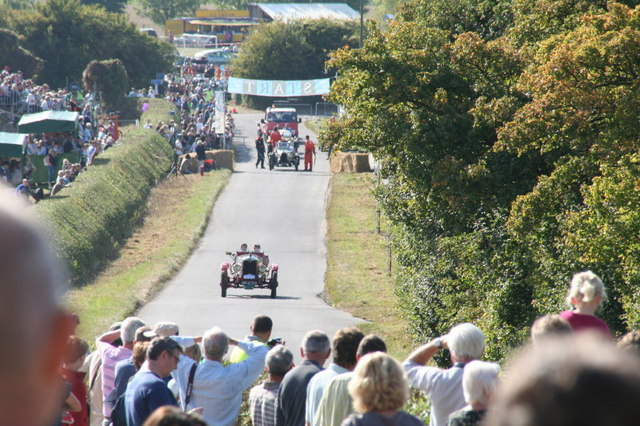
View back to the start, 2009

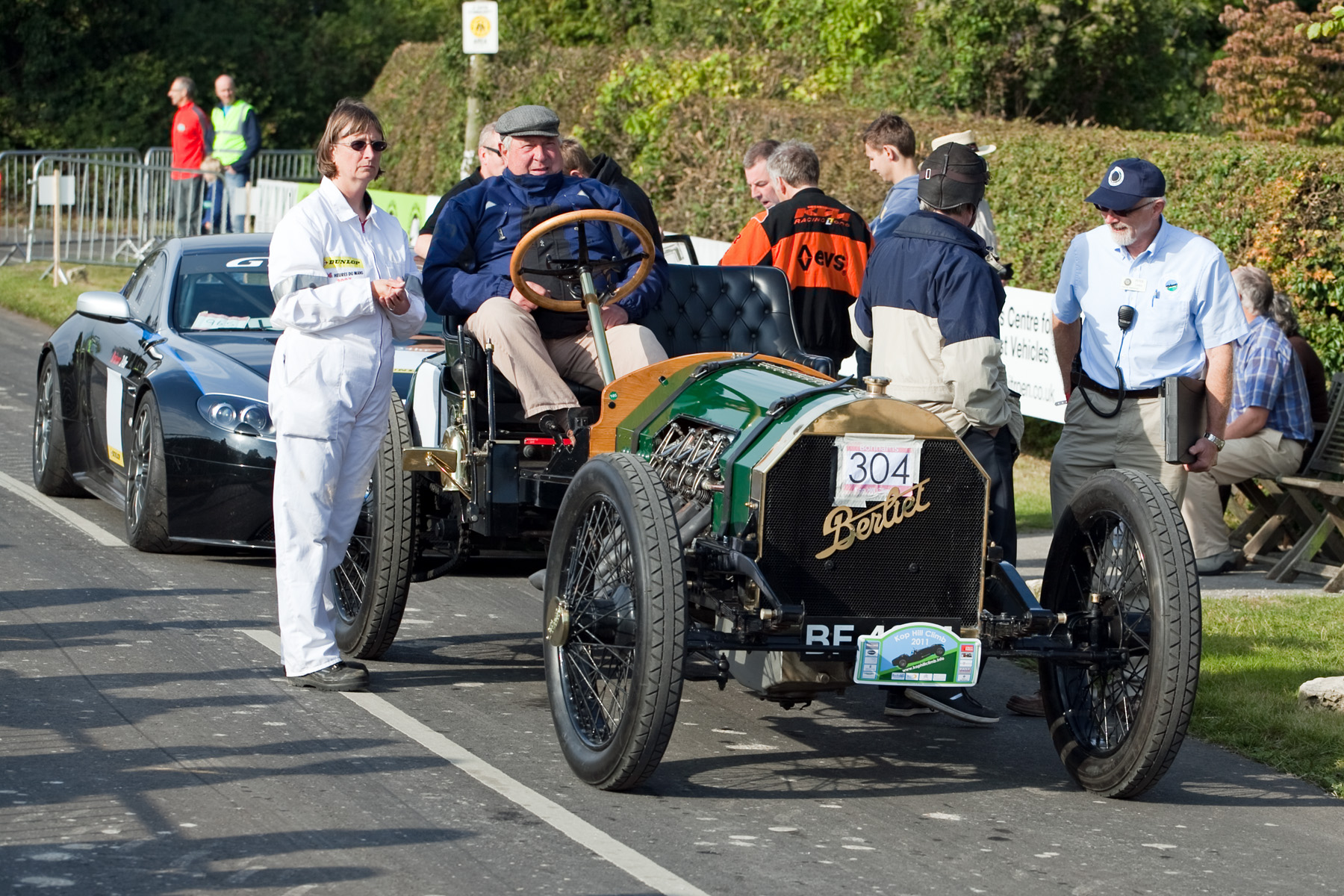
Berliet, 2011

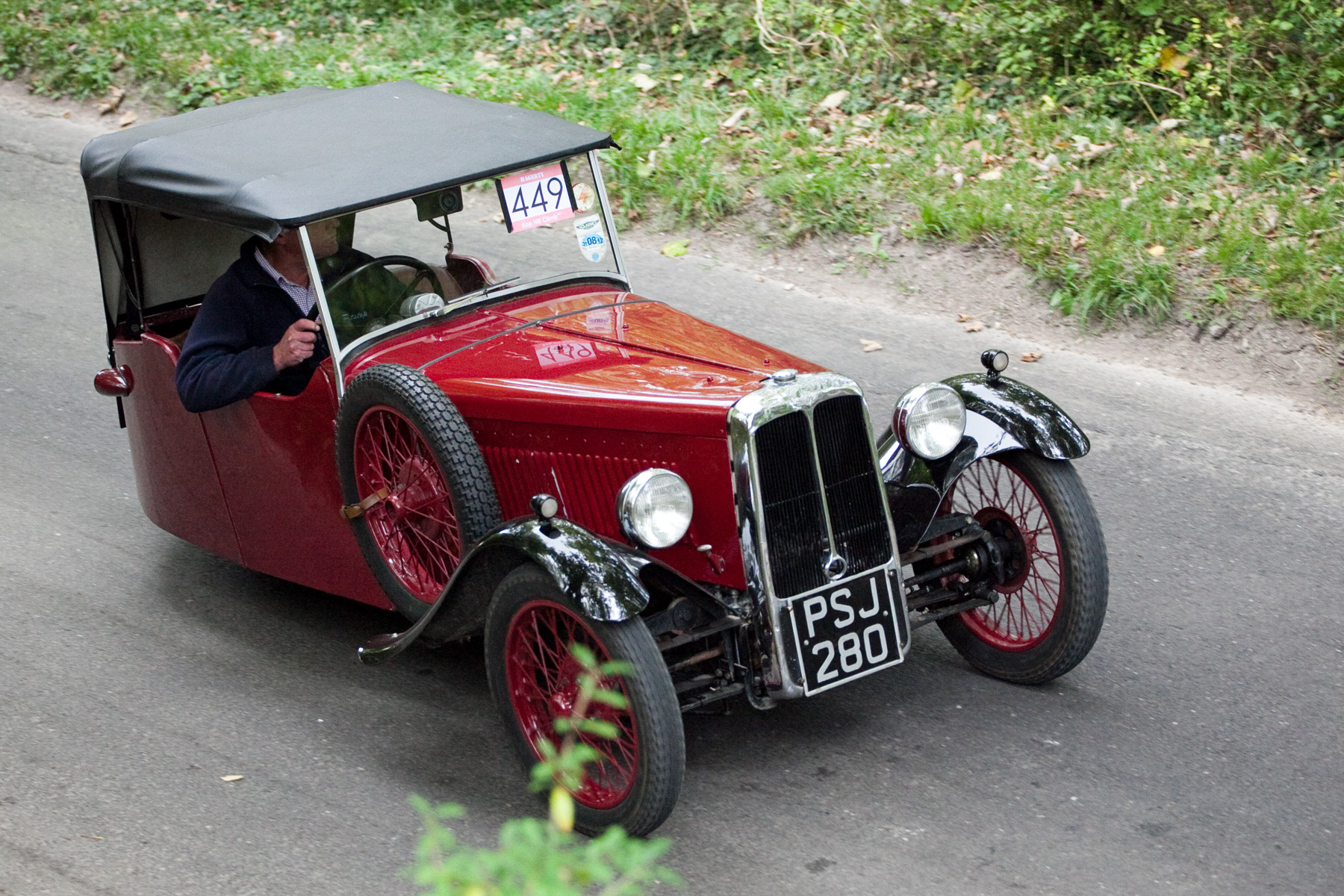
BSA, 2011

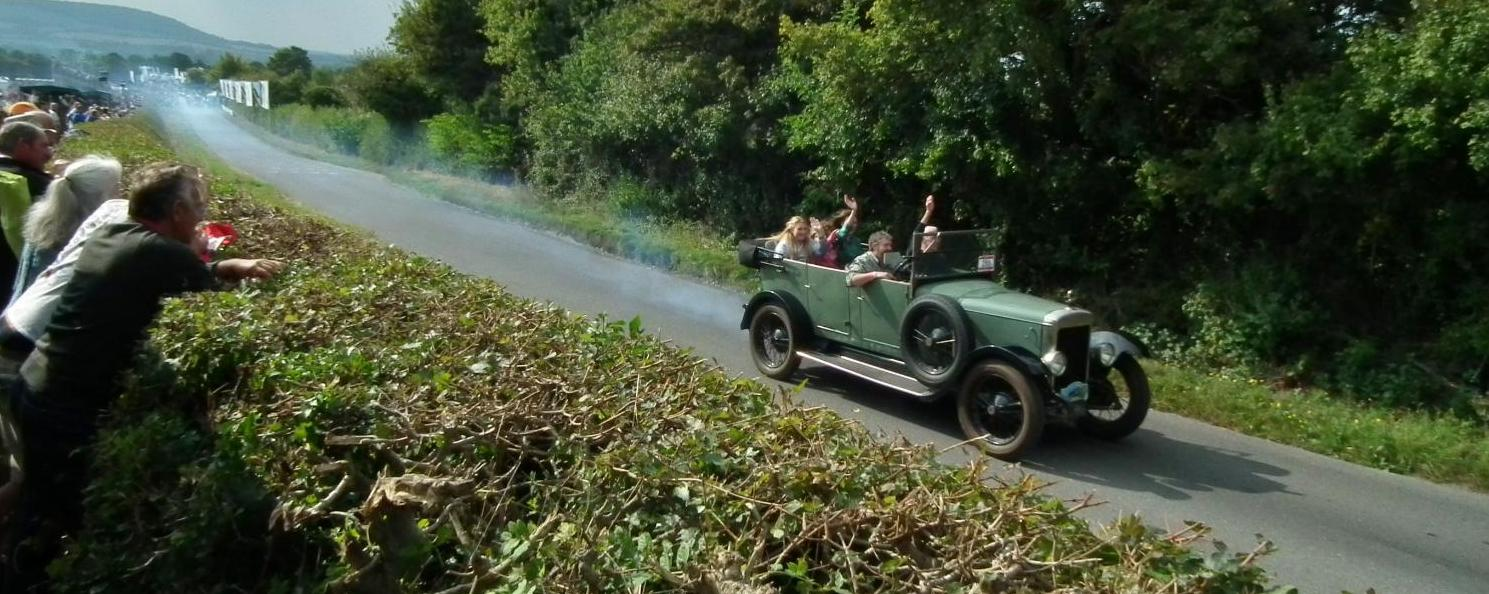
Daimler 16-55, 2014

== Records ==
The fastest time recorded for a car was in 1922 when Louis Zborowski driving a Ballot GP achieved 26.8 seconds, and the fastest motorcycle was in 1925 with Freddie Dixon achieving a time of 22.8 seconds with a 736 cc Douglas at an average of 81 mph (130 km/h).
