= JCC 200 Mile race =

Auto races in the United Kingdom

A map of Brooklands after the construction of the Campbell circuit, also showing the original Outer Circuit including the Finishing Straight.

The Junior Car Club 200 Mile race was a voiturette and later Grand Prix motor race, first held in 1921. It was held on various layouts of Brooklands, and twice at Donington Park.

== History ==
=== Early history ===
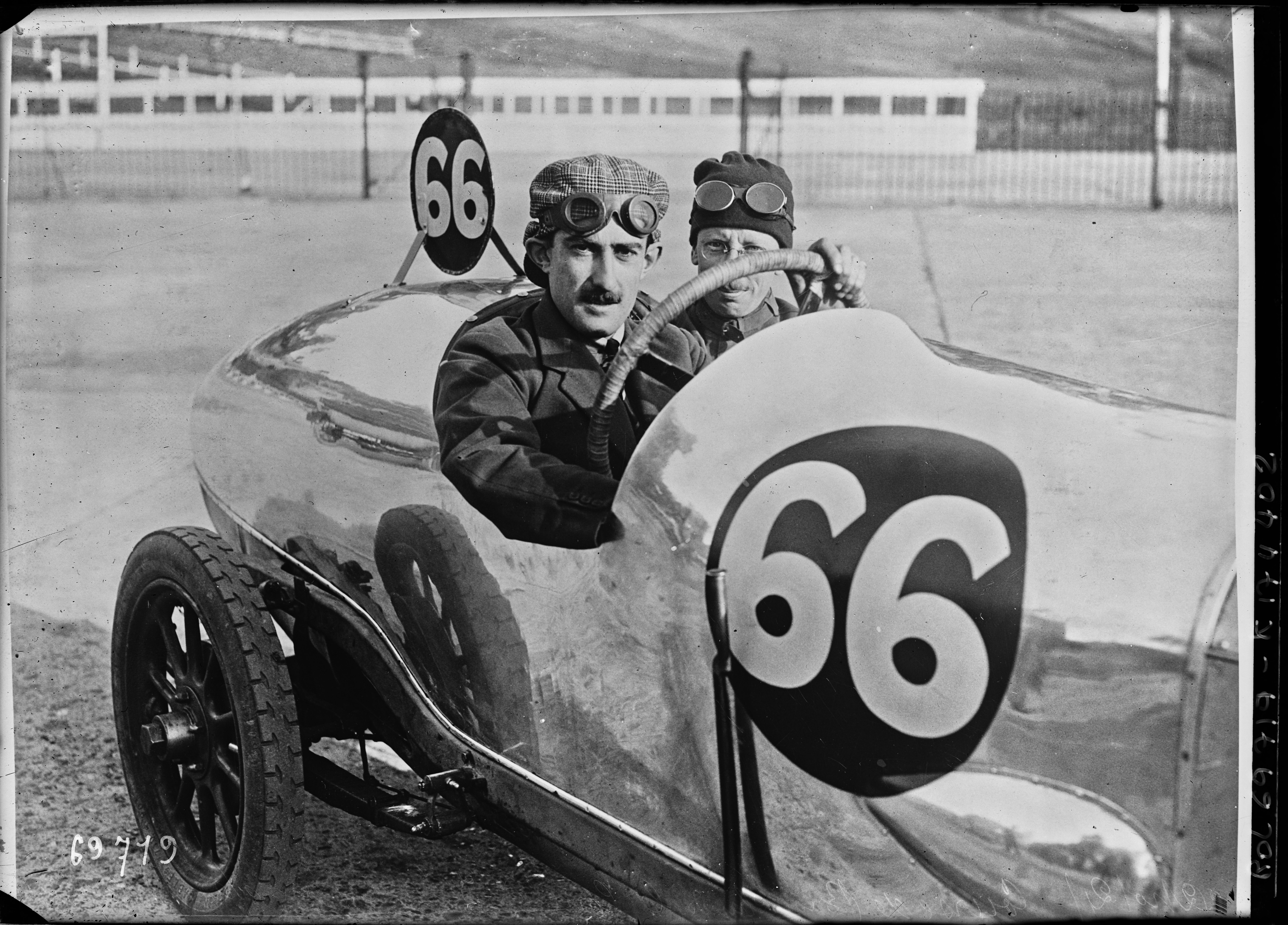
Count Louis Zborowski came in 10th place in the 200 Mile race on 22 October 1921 in an 1,486 ccm Aston Martin.

The race started as a race for small capacity racing cars, initially with two classes, up to 1.5 litres and up to 1100cc, racing around the outer circuit of Brooklands. A 750cc class was introduced from 1924, although it was effectively contested only by Austin 7s. STD cars dominated the 1.5 litre class through the 1920s, winning every year they sent a factory team for five wins, three for Henry Segrave, two for Kenelm Lee Guinness. With the exception of the GN which won in 1921, the 1100cc class was dominated by French cars, Salmson winning each year 1922 to 1925, and Amilcar from 1926 to 1928.

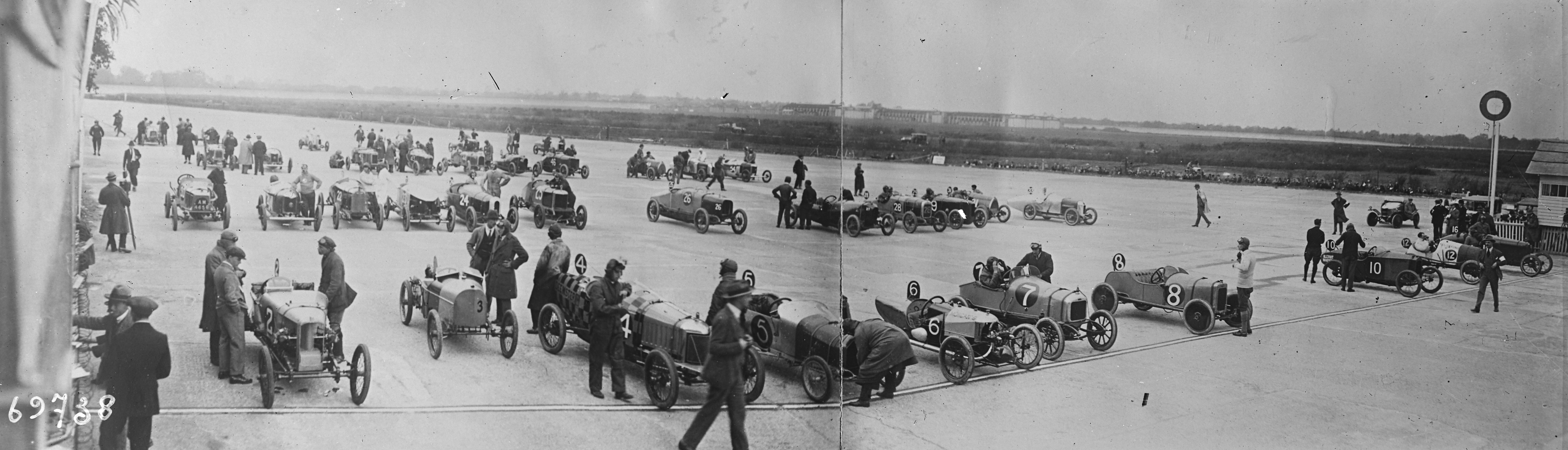
Start of 1921 race

With the exception of privately entered Bugattis, international entrants were rare in the largest class in the first half of the 1920s. An exception was 1923 when FIAT sent a team to take on the British manufacturers. Although Talbot did not ultimately send a team, Aston Martin were expected to be strong competitors having come second and third in the Voiturette Grand Prix in Boulogne earlier in the year. In the race however most of the leading competitors suffered issues, and it was the nearly standard Alvis 12/50 of Maurice Harvey that won the race.

=== Artificial circuits ===
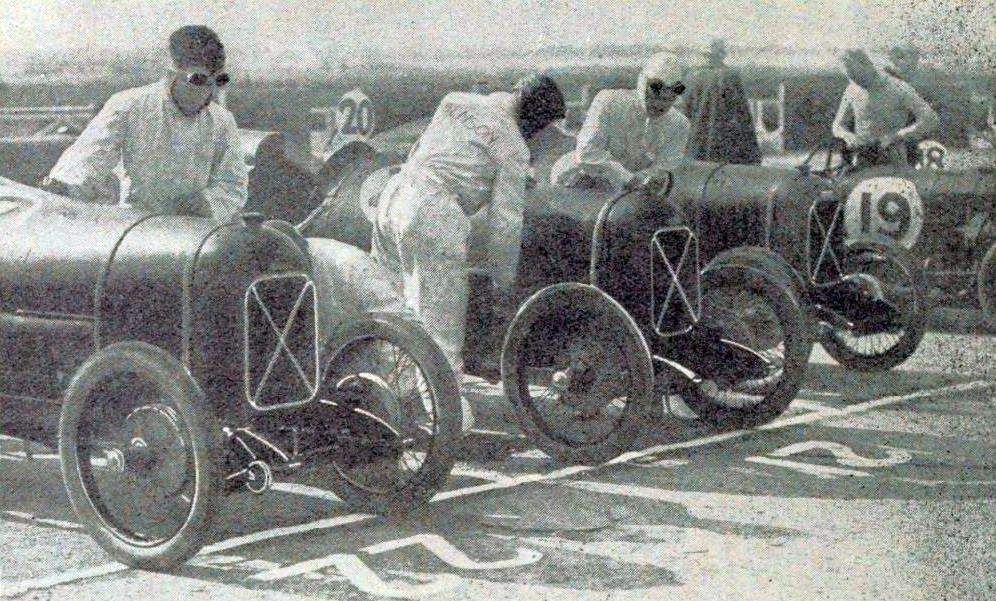
The Salmson team prior to the start of the 1925 race.

From 1925, in order to make the race more interesting, and to distinguish it from other long races which began taking place on the outer circuit, it was decided to introduce some artificial turns to create more of a road circuit. The first layout tried had the cars keep left at the Fork after coming off of the Byfleet Banking, then around a sharp hairpin and back down to a second hairpin at the fork to head towards the Members Banking. This proved to be quite popular although obvious deficiencies were noticed with this layout.

From 1926 the international Grand Prix formula restricted engines to 1.5 litres, the same as for the 200 Mile race. Earlier in the year, the first British Grand Prix was held on a different variant of Brooklands, which had two chicanes along the Finishing Straight but had no hairpin turns. In that race the unready Talbots had been defeated by the Delage and Bugatti teams, but for the 200 Mile race in the absence of factory entered Delages and Bugattis were able to take a convincing 1-2 victory (with Jules Moriceau’s Talbot crashing into a sandbank at around half distance). For the 1926 200 Mile race the circuit had been modified, now with a hairpin on the approach to the Members Banking, cars returning to the Fork to a second hairpin onto the Finishing Straight which included two chicanes, similar to those on the Grand Prix layout. This layout was used again with few changes in 1927 and 1928.

For 1927, with it becoming clearer that the 1.5 litre Grand Prix formula was a failure, the works teams stayed away, with Malcolm Campbell taking a close victory from three semi-works 1100cc Amilcars. Campbell would repeat this in 1928 with his privately entered 1927 Grand Prix Delage.

=== Demise and revival ===
It was already clear from 1927 that the days of the race were numbered, with the 1928 race attracting a poor entry and few spectators. This is partly attributed to the lack of manufacturer interest in Grand Prix style racing in this period, preferring to focus on sports car racing where development costs could be better offset by sales.

The JCC decided to replace the race from 1929 with the Brooklands Double Twelve for sports cars.

The race would be revived in 1936, now to be held at Donington. The race was held for unrestricted racing cars, but class prizes were to be awarded to the best under 1.5 litre cars. In the race however Richard Seaman won, driving a 10 year old 1.5 litre Delage of the same type Malcolm Campbell had used to win in 1928, against strong opposition from ERA and privately entered Grand Prix Alfa Romeos and Bugattis. A 1.5 litre car won again in 1937, this time an ERA driven by AC Dobson.

For 1938 the race returned to Brooklands, this time at the Campbell layout. The 1100cc class was reintroduced, as well a separate prize for the best over 1.5 litre car, which was won by Prince Bira in a Maserati, with the overall victory again going to a 1.5 litre ERA.

The race had been scheduled to take place again at Brooklands in 1939 but was cancelled due to the outbreak of World War II.

After the War, the Junior Car Club was reformed into the British Automobile Racing Club. With the opening of the Aintree Motor Racing Circuit in 1954 the race was revived as the Aintree 200 Miles.

== Winners ==
Year	Circuit	Outright Winner	Over 1.5L Winner (Note: Over 1.5 litre cars only allowed from 1936. No class winner officially recognised except for 1938)	1.5L Winner	1100cc Winner	750cc Winner (Note: 850cc in 1928)
1921	Outer Circuit	Henry Segrave; Talbot-Darracq	Not held	Henry Segrave; Talbot-Darracq	Archibald Frazer-Nash; GN	Not held
1922	Outer Circuit	Separate class races (Note: For 1922 and 1923 two separate races were held, with the 1100cc cars racing in the morning and the 1.5 litre cars in the afternoon)	Not held	Kenelm Lee Guinness; Talbot-Darracq	Robert Benoist; Salmson	Not held
1923	Outer Circuit	Separate class races	Not held	Maurice Harvey; Alvis	R. Bueno; Salmson	Not held
1924	Outer Circuit	Kenelm Lee Guinness; Darracq	Not held	Kenelm Lee Guinness; Darracq	O. Wilson-Jones; Salmson	G. England; Austin
1925	First artificial circuit	Henry Segrave; Darracq	Not held	Henry Segrave; Darracq	J. Goutte; Salmson	G. England; Austin
1926	Second artificial circuit	Henry Segrave; Talbot	Not held	Henry Segrave; Talbot	Charles Martin; Amilcar	G. England; Austin
1927	Second artificial circuit	Malcolm Campbell; Bugatti	Not held	Malcolm Campbell; Bugatti	André Morel; Amilcar	C. Chase; Austin
1928	Second artificial circuit	Malcolm Campbell; Delage	Not held	Malcolm Campbell; Delage	Vernon Balls; Amilcar	H. Spero; Austin
1929 – 1935	Not held					
1936	Donington Park	Richard Seaman; Delage	Thomas Cholmondeley-Tapper; Maserati	Richard Seaman; Delage	Not held	Not held
1937	Donington Park	Arthur Dobson; ERA	B. Bira; Maserati	Arthur Dobson; ERA	Not held	Not held
1938	Campbell Circuit	Johnny Wakefield; ERA	B. Bira; Maserati	Johnny Wakefield; ERA	Angus Cuddon-Fletcher; MG	Not held
