= 1949 24 Hours of Spa =

14th 24 Hours of Spa endurance race

Seasons
- ← 1948 1953 →

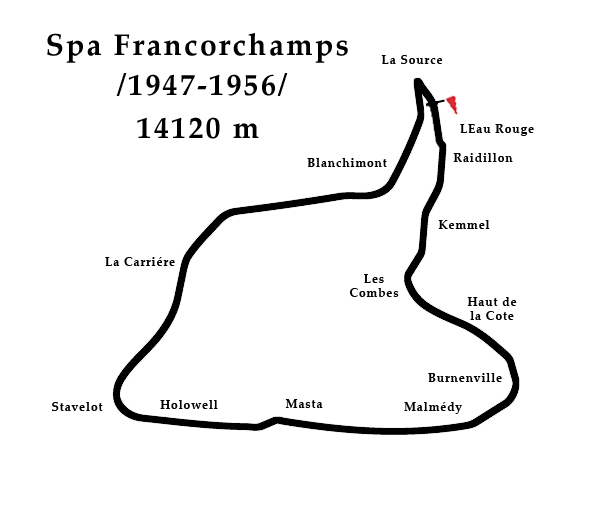
The layout of the Circuit de Spa-Francorchamps (1947–1956), where the race was held

The 1949 24 Hours of Spa was the 14th running of the 24 Hours of Spa. The race took place from 9 to 10 July 1949 at the Circuit de Spa-Francorchamps in Stavelot, Belgium.

== Report ==
=== Schedule ===
From 6 to 8 July, there were five practice sessions held in the lead up to the race, one on Wednesday (6 July) and two on Thursday and Friday (7 and 8 July). The race began on 9 July at 16:00 CET.

=== Entry ===
A grand total of 39 racing cars were registered for this event, of which 30 started the race. Headlining the entries were Luigi Chinetti and Jean Lucas in a Ferrari 166 MM, two factory-entered Aston Martin DB2s and two Delage D6-3Ls from Louis Gérard and Henri Louveau. Gordini arrived with a trio of cars, two Simca-Gordini T15Ss and one Simca-Gordini TMM. H.R.G. brought four S 1.5 class vehicles, one H.R.G. Airline Coupe and three H.R.G. 1500 LWs for Ecurie Lapin Blanc. Although initially reported to be competing in the Spa 24 Hours, the Italian duo of Alberto Ascari and Luigi Villoresi never appeared in any session aboard the Ferrari 166 MM.

=== Race ===
The race began at 16:00 CET, where Maurice Trintignant took the lead in his Simca-Gordini T15S. However, the Frenchman ran into electrical problems and handed the lead over to fellow Gordini stablemate, Robert Manzon. After running in second-place for three hours, Luigi Chinetti took the lead from Manzon in his Ferrari 166 MM. Eventually Trintignant's electrical issues led to ignition failure and retirement, while the Capelli brothers (Diego and Ovidio) of Scuderia Ambrosiana failed to repair the axle of their Fiat 1100S within an hour, ending their race. Just 30 minutes from the finish, Henri Louveau was running in second in his Delage D6-3L, when he had oil steam from the six-cylinder engine, dropping it along the 14.12 kilometres (8.77 mi) circuit. Chinetti came upon an oil patch at the Hollowell corner, sliding off the road and collided with a woman spectator and a house. The American rendered aid to the affected before climbing aboard his damaged Ferrari to return to the pits for repairs. The team sent him back out to complete the final two laps and limp home with the victory. Chinetti became the first driver to win at Le Mans and Spa in the same year and, he and teammate Jean Lucas, had a combined age of 79, a record for the oldest two-man crew to win the Spa 24.

== Race result ==
Class winners denoted in bold

Pos.	Class	No.	Team	Drivers	Car	Laps
1	**S** **2.0**	**20**	**(United States) Luigi Chinetti Motors**	**(United States) Luigi Chinetti** **(France) Jean Lucas**	**Ferrari 166 MM**	**210**
2	**S** **4.0**	**8**	**(France) Henri Louveau**	**(France) Henri Louveau** **(France) Edmond Mouche**	**Delage D6-3L**	**200**
3	S 4.0	14	(United Kingdom) Aston Martin Cars Ltd.	(United Kingdom) Charles Brackenbury (United Kingdom) Leslie Johnson	Aston Martin DB2	204
4	S 2.0	28	(United Kingdom) Jock Horsfall	(Belgium) Paul Frère (United Kingdom) Jock Horsfall	Aston Martin Speed Model	202
5	S 2.0	30	(United Kingdom) Aston Martin Cars Ltd.	(United Kingdom) Nick Haines (United Kingdom) Lance Macklin	Aston Martin DB2	197
6	**S** **1.1**	**68**	**(Italy) Scuderia Ambrosiana**	**(Italy) Aldo Bassi** **(Italy) Mario Brambilla**	**Fiat 1100S**	
7	S 2.0	38	(Luxembourg) Honoré Wagner	(France) François Sigrand (Luxembourg) Honoré Wagner	BMW 328	
8	S 2.0	40	(Belgium) Herman Roosdorp	(Belgium) Adolf de Ridder (Belgium) Herman Roosdorp	Ferrari 166 MM	
9	**T** **2.0**	**86**	**(United Kingdom) Jowett Cars Ltd.**	**(United Kingdom) Anthony Hume** **(United Kingdom) Tommy Wisdom**	**Jowett Javelin**	
10	**S** **1.5**	**44**	**(United Kingdom) Ecurie Lapin Blanc**	**(United Kingdom) Jack Fairman** **(United Kingdom) Eric Thompson**	**H.R.G. 1500 LW**	
11	**T** **4.0**	**96**	**(France) Yvonne Simon**	**(France) Germaine Rouault** **(France) Yvonne Simon**	**Delahaye 135CS**	
12	S 2.0	42		(United Kingdom) Dickie Stoop (United Kingdom) Peter Wilson	Frazer Nash	
13	S 1.1	70	(Italy) Scuderia Ambrosiana	(Belgium) Émile Cornet (Italy) Geremia Merati	Fiat 1100S	
14	T 4.0	102	(Netherlands) Carel Godin de Beaufort	(Netherlands) Charles de Beaufort (Netherlands) Carel Godin de Beaufort	Ford V8	
15	T 2.0			(Belgium) Nerinckx (Belgium) Van Malder	MG Touring	
16	S 1.5	52	(United Kingdom) Ecurie Lapin Blanc	(United Kingdom) Ray Brock (United Kingdom) Bob Freeman Wright	H.R.G. Airline Coupe	
17	S 2.0	26	(Belgium) Louis Eggen	(France) François-Joseph Escalle (Belgium) Louis Eggen	Peugeot	
18	**S** **750**	**80**	**(Belgium) Healers**	**(Belgium) Georges Andre** **(Belgium) L. Delhaes**	**Aero Minor**	
19	S 1.5	46	(United Kingdom) Ecurie Lapin Blanc	(Belgium) André Pilette (United Kingdom) Jack Scott	H.R.G. 1500 LW	
20	S 1.5	48	(United Kingdom) Ecurie Lapin Blanc	(United Kingdom) Peter Clark (United Kingdom) Mortimer Morris-Goodall	H.R.G. 1500 LW	
Ret	T 2.0		(Belgium) Jacques Swaters	(Belgium) Jacques Swaters (Belgium) Charles de Tornaco	BMW 328	Did not finish
Ret	S 4.0	4	(Belgium) Franz Breyre	(Belgium) Franz Breyre (Belgium) Trassenster	Delage D6-3L	Did not finish
Ret	S 4.0	6	(United Kingdom) W. S. Watney	(France) Louis Gérard (France) Pierre Levegh	Delage D6-3L	Did not finish
Ret	S 2.0	22	(Belgium) Roger Laurent	(Belgium) Roger Laurent (Belgium) Unzel	Veritas	Did not finish
Ret	S 2.0	32	(United Kingdom) Dudley Folland	(United Kingdom) Dudley Folland (United Kingdom) Anthony Heal	Aston Martin Speed Model	Did not finish
Ret	S 2.0	34	(Belgium) Marcel Masuy	(Belgium) Marcel Masuy	BMW 328	Did not finish
Ret	S 1.5	58	(France) Amédée Gordini	(France) Yves Giraud-Cabantous (France) Robert Manzon	Simca-Gordini T15S	Did not finish
Ret	S 1.5	60	(France) Amédée Gordini	(France) Maurice Trintignant (France) Pierre Veyron	Simca-Gordini T15S	Ignition
Ret	S 1.1	64	(France) Amédée Gordini	(France) Aldo Gordini (France) José Scaron	Simca-Gordini TMM	Did not finish
Ret	S 1.1	72	(Italy) Scuderia Ambrosiana	(Italy) Diego Capelli (Italy) Ovidio Capelli	Fiat 1100S	Axle

== Statistics ==
- Fastest Lap - #60 Simca-Gordini T15S

== Bibliography ==
- Blumlein, David (December 2014). The Spa 24 Hours, A History. Transport Bookman Publications. ISBN 9780851840772.
