= British Automobile Racing Club =

Motor racing organisation in the UK

The British Automobile Racing Club (BARC) is one of the biggest organising clubs for motor racing in the United Kingdom.

== History ==
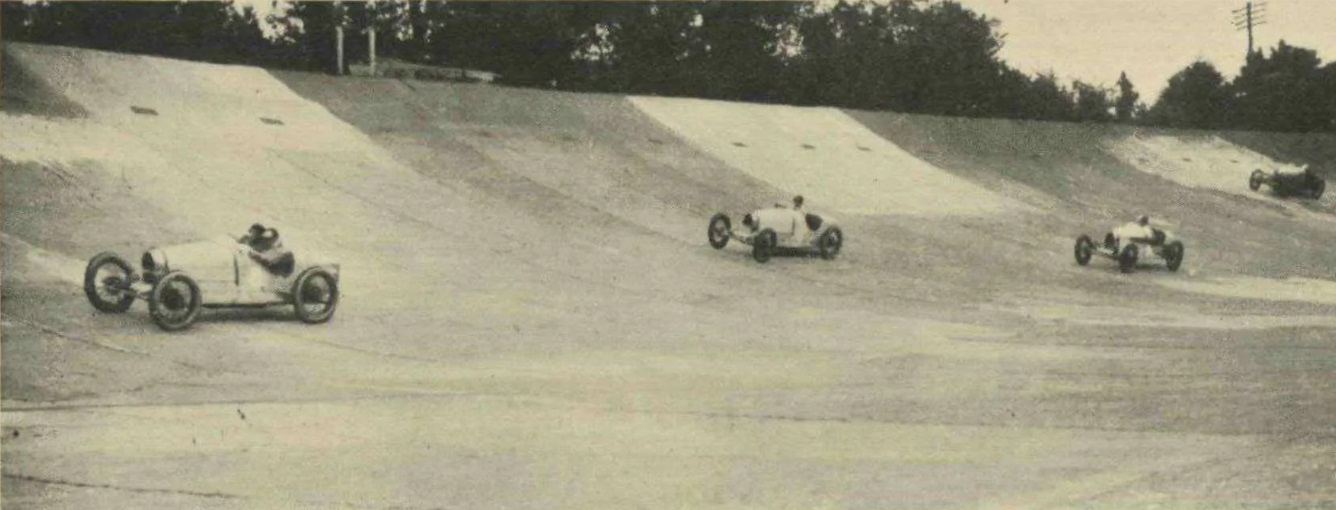
Four Bugattis racing at a 1926 club meeting at Brooklands

The Cyclecar Club was formed in 1912, running races for the small and light motorbike powered vehicles at Brooklands as well as rallies and sporting trials. Among the founder members of the club were H.R. Godfrey and Archie Frazer-Nash.

In 1919, with cyclecars on the decline, the name of the club changed to the Junior Car Club (JCC). The club was immediately successful, with regional centres being formed in 1921, the same year the JCC 200 Mile race at Brooklands was organised, the first long-distance race to be run in Britain. The race, a contest for 1,500 c.c. light cars, was won by Henry Segrave in a Talbot-Darracq. Captain Frazer Nash (G.N.) won the cyclecar race. Further long-distance races were organised both at Brooklands and Donington Park, as well as rallies and International Trophy Races.

After the Second World War, due to the demise of Brooklands, the JCC was amalgamated with the Brooklands Automobile Racing Club. The club then based itself at Goodwood Circuit, changing its name to the British Automobile Racing Club in 1949. Over the next 18 years, BARC organised at least one international meeting at Goodwood a year, notably Easter Monday Formula One races and 9-hour sportscar races—the first night races to be run in Britain. The club was also involved in the opening meeting at Crystal Palace in 1953, and organised the British Grand Prix when held at Aintree in the late 50s and early 60s.

In 1951 the BARC Eastbourne Rally was held on 30 June with the best performance by Bancroft in a Ford 10 saloon. The event featured a Midnight Concours d'Elegance. During the period 1956–1967 the BARC organised competitive events at the Firle Hill Climb in Sussex. The event held on Sunday, 2 June 1957, was run in conjunction with the BARC 11th Annual Rally at Eastbourne, a 50-mile road event held the day before, starting at the Grasshopper Inn near Westerham, with intermittent driving tests, including one at Butts Hill, Willingdon, and then on to Eastbourne, via Beachy Head.

Goodwood was closed on safety grounds in 1966. The last event was a club meeting organised by the BARC on 2 July 1966. The club relocated to Thruxton Circuit in Hampshire, opening in 1968, and becoming club headquarters in 1974.

== Racing ==
Today, the BARC organises a large number of race series. The club is the organising club for the British Touring Car Championship, the Silverstone rounds of the World Sportscar and Rallycross Championships, and the support races at each weekend. Another major commitment is the organising of the annual Goodwood Members Meeting, Goodwood Revival and the Goodwood Festival of Speed meetings.

The club also organises many smaller "club racing" meetings, featuring such classes as Classic Formula Ford, Caterhams, Clubmans and Legend Cars. As well as the many events organised by the headquarters at Thruxton, certain BARC regions organise race meetings too. There are five centres in the UK and one in Canada. the Midlands Centre, North Western Centre, the South Western Centre, the Wales Centre and the Yorkshire Centre.

As well as the BARC's own events, the club frequently is the national appointed club for visiting international series. For example, in 1995 the BARC organised the first ever UK round of the FIA International Touring Car series. The club had a particularly active role in organising A1 Grand Prix and the Grand Prix Masters series, both at home and abroad.

The BARC is also in the unusual situation of running race circuits. As well as the home of the club at Thruxton, in 1990 they signed a 50-year lease on Pembrey Circuit in south Wales and in 2006, the BARC took on Croft Circuit, near Darlington and so bringing the total number of circuits owned to three.

== Other activities ==
The BARC runs more than just race meetings. As well as the Goodwood Festival of Speed, the club organises a number of hillclimbs and sprints. These include meetings at Gurston Down near Salisbury and Harewood Yorkshire both BARC Venues. More recently it organizes the Coventry Motofest and in 2018 it was the first event to be held on public roads since the law change in 2017.

The club also has a social side, with a number of events over a year including regional dinners and the Big Night Out, the latter being held every year in February. It is the club's awards night celebrating the previous years champions.

The BARC partnered with Racing Pride in 2019 to support greater inclusivity across the British motorsport industry for LGBT+ fans, employees and drivers

== BARC-Ontario Centre ==
Due to the existence of a regional 'Centre' in Ontario, Canada, the club has a role in organising Ice Racing events. In 2010 the Kendall Award for the most successful BARC-Ontario driver, in events held outside the region of Ontario, went to Robert Wickens.
