= Shelsley Walsh Speed Hill Climb =

Motorsport event in Worcestershire, England

Shelsley Walsh
- Location: Shelsley Walsh, Worcestershire, England
- Time zone: GMT
- Coordinates: 52.2622°N 2.4152°W
- Opened: 1905
- Major Events: British Hill Climb Championship
- Hill Length: 1,000 yards (910 m)
- Hill Record: 22.20 (Wallace Menzies, 2026, British Hill Climb Championship)

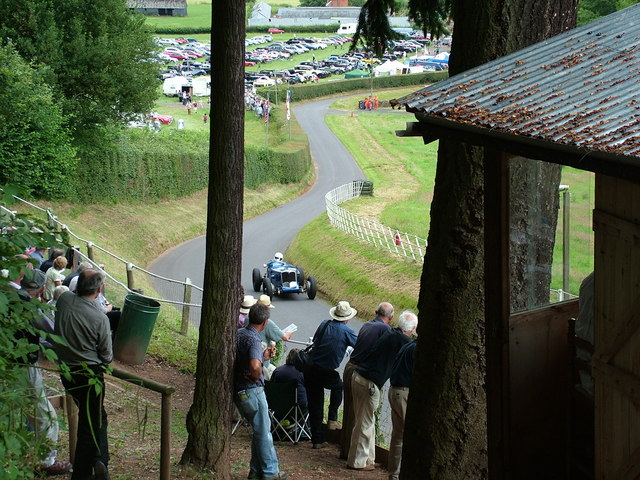
A competitor coming up to the first viewing enclosure

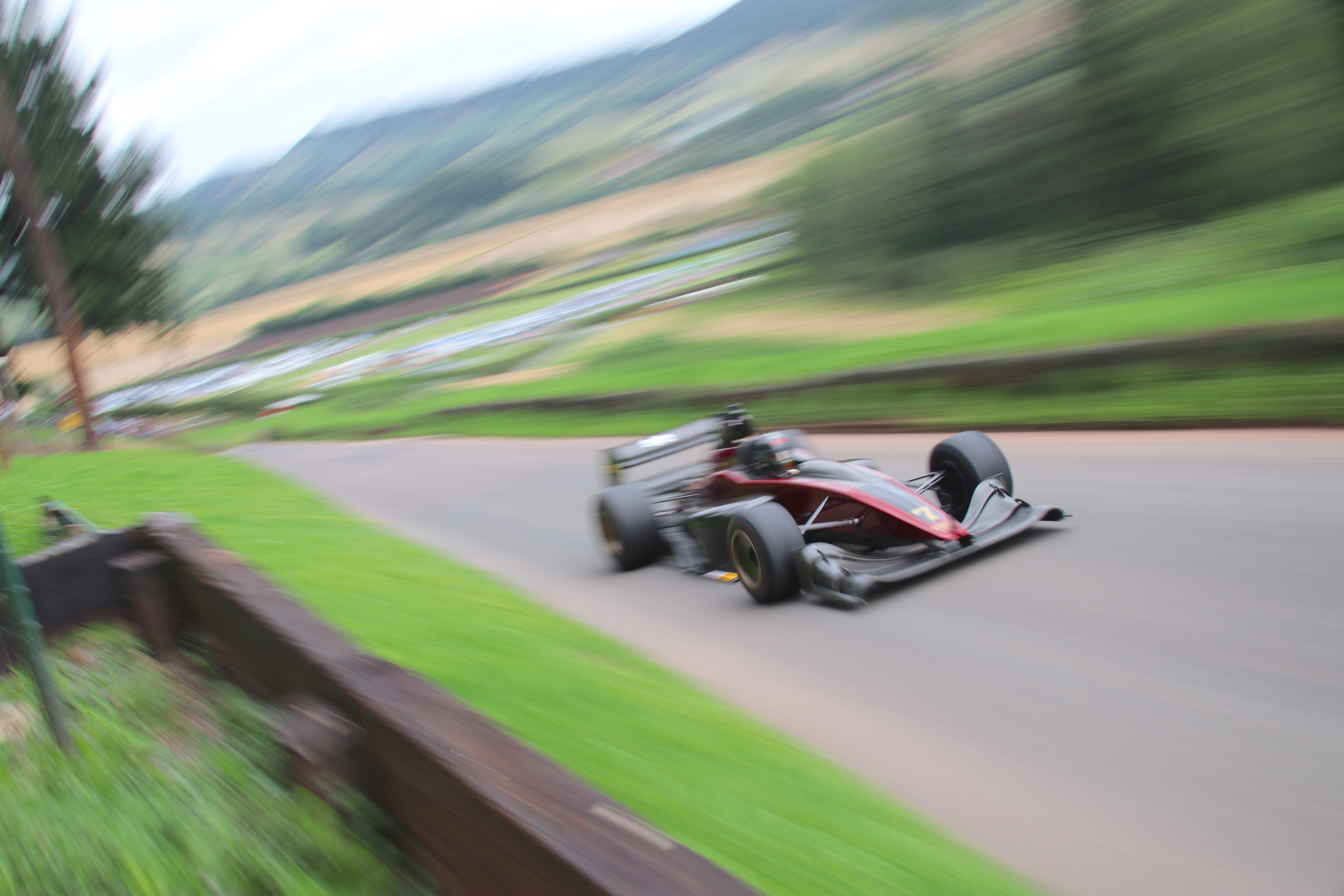
Sean Gould, lowering the 2008 Shelsley Walsh record in August 2021; unsurpassed until 2026

The Shelsley Walsh Speed Hill Climb is a hillclimb in Shelsley Walsh, Worcestershire, England, organised by the Midland Automobile Club (MAC). It is the third oldest motorsport event in the world, and is the oldest to have been staged continuously (wartime excepted) on its original course, first having been run in 1905. On that first occasion, the course was 992 yards (907 m) in length, but in 1907 it was standardised at 1000 yards (914 m), the length it remains today.

Shelsley Walsh is a notably steep course by the standards of today's hillclimbs held in the United Kingdom. It rises 328 feet (100 m) during its length, for an average gradient of 1 in 9.14 (10.9%), with the steepest section being as much as 1 in 6.24 (16%). This makes Shelsley a hill on which power is important, and on which the gap in times between the most powerful cars and the rest is greater than at many other venues. It is also narrow, being no more than 12 feet (3.66 m) wide at some points.

== History ==
=== Early years ===
The winner of the first event, held on Saturday 12 August 1905, was Ernest Instone (35 hp Daimler), who established the hill record by recording a time of 77.6 seconds for an average speed of 26.15 mph (42.08 km/h). However, at that time hillclimbs were not strictly speed events at all, performances being rated in terms of a formula based on power and cars of 20 hp or more being required to be four-seaters and to carry passengers. All cars were required to carry full touring trim and a full load of passengers. The winner was calculated by multiplying the car's time in seconds by the horsepower, and then divided by the total weight (including the weight of the driver and passengers and any ballast). There was also the question of whether a particular car would make it up the hill at all. In these early years, drivers' times were not announced to spectators.

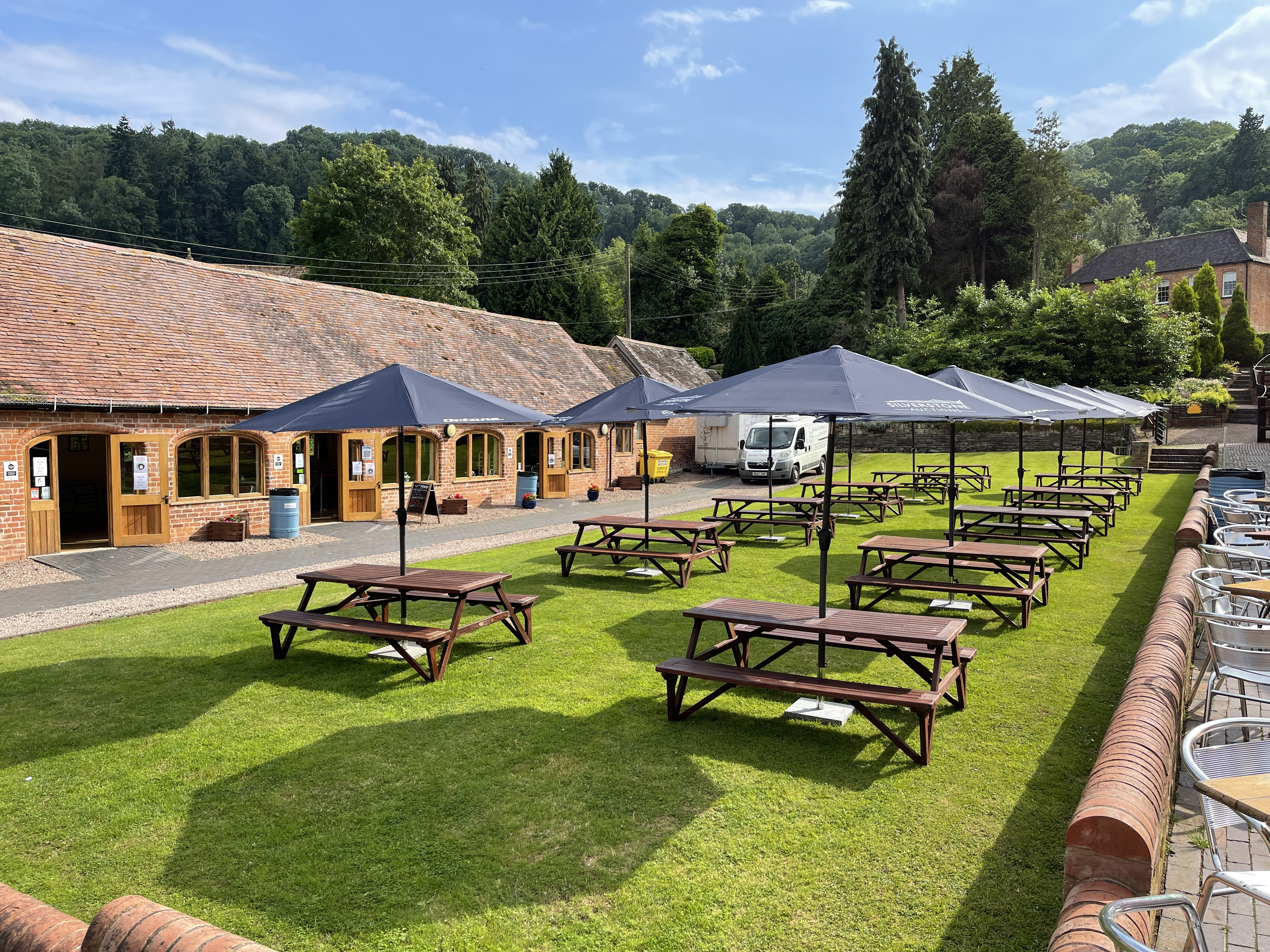
Shelsley Walsh Courtyard 2021

==== Shelsley Walsh winners from 1905 to 1912 ====
Year	Date	Winner on Formula Driver (Make)	Fastest Time Driver (Make)	Time (seconds)
1905	12 August	G.F. Heath (De Dion)	E.M.C. Instone (Daimler)	77.6
1906	16 June	T.W. Husband (Alldays)	F.A. Coleman (White)	80.6
1907	14 July	T.W.Bowen (Talbot)	J.E. Hutton (Berliet)	67.2
1908		P.C. Kidner (Vauxhall)	S.F. Edge (Napier)	65.4
1909		P.C. Kidner (Vauxhall)	H.C. Holder (Daimler)	68.4
1910		R. Lisle (Star)	O.S. Thompson (Austin)	70.2
1911	10 June	P.C. Kidner (Vauxhall)	H.C. Holder (Daimler)	63.4
1912	22 June	C. Bianchi (Crossley)	J. Higginson (La Buire)	68.8

=== First speed events ===
Restrictions on competing cars were dropped from 1913, meaning that specialised racing cars were now eligible to enter Shelsley. Unsurprisingly, climbs immediately became much faster, and on 7 June 1913, Joseph Higginson's Vauxhall 30-98 recorded the best time of the day: 55.2 seconds, more than eight seconds faster than H. C. Holder's mark of 63.4 seconds which had been set just two years before. The First World War intervened and hillclimbing did not resume until July 1920. The formula competition continued into the 1920s but focus quickly shifted towards earning fastest time of the day (FTD). Awards were also given for a cyclecar class in 1913, and a light car class from 1920–1922, and also recognised was the fastest amateur driver who was a member of the organising club, known as the closed winner.

==== Shelsley Walsh winners from 1913 to 1922 ====
Year	Date	Class	Winner on Time Driver (Make)	Time (seconds)	Winner on Formula Driver (Make)
1913	7 June	Open	L. Hands (Talbot)^{A}	57.2	H.G. Day (Talbot)
1913	7 June	Cyclecar	W.D. South (Morgan)	91.4	G.W. Hands (Calthorpe)
1920	3 July	Open	C.A. Bird (Sunbeam)	58.6	L.T. Kings (Austin)
1920	3 July	Closed	G.D. Pearce-Jones (Vauxhall)	60.2	J.A. Barber-Lomax (Vauxhall)
1920	3 July	Light Car	A. Frazer-Nash (G.N.)	60.2	C.C. Ash (Hillman)
1921	10 September	Open	C.A. Bird (Sunbeam)	52.2	A. Waite (Austin)
1921	10 September	Light Car	A. Frazer-Nash (G.N.)	54.8	W.F. Milward (Charron-Laycock)
1921	10 September	Closed	G.A. Vandervell (Talbot)	63.0	J.A. Barber-Lomax (Vauxhall)
1922	29 August	Open	M.C. Park (Vauxhall)	53.8	L. King (Austin)
1922	29 August	Closed	H.W. Cook (Vauxhall)	56.8	H.W. Cook (Vauxhall)
1922	29 August	Light Car	H.K. Moir (Aston Martin)	57.2	L. Martin (Aston Martin)

^A Joseph Higginson set a time of 55.2 seconds on his third run but at the time only a driver's first run counted.

=== 1920s ===
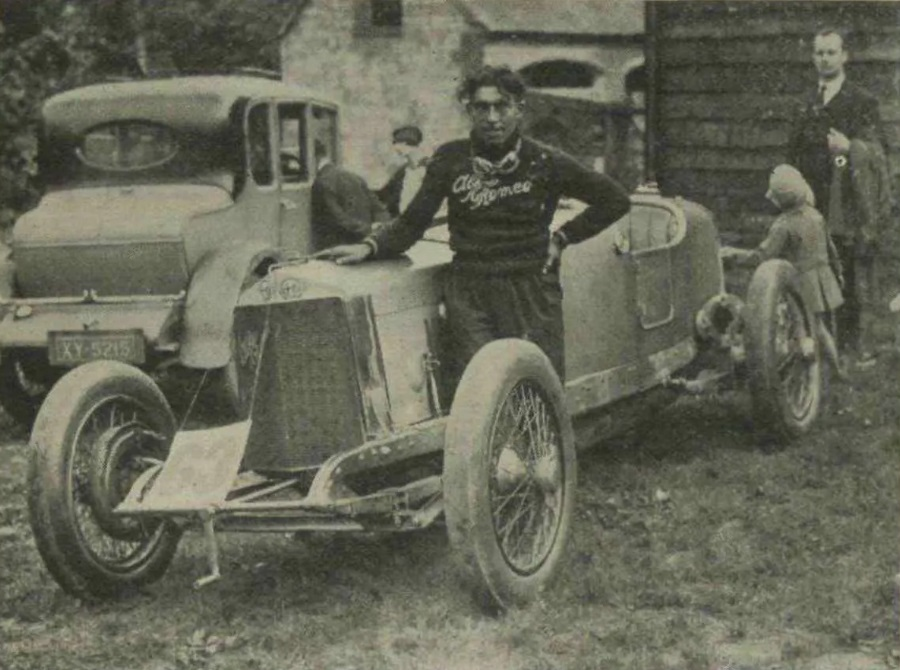
Italian driver Vittorio Rosa with his Alfa Romeo at Shelsley Walsh in 1926

Times continued to come down, and during the 1920s the emphasis moved firmly away from reliability and onto speed. A new generation of competitors emerged with Count Zborowski of Chitty Bang Bang fame driving a Sunbeam in 1921 and Raymond Mays taking to the hill for the first time in a self tuned Hillman. Basil Davenport was perhaps Shelsley's first "superstar", breaking the hill record four times between 1926 and 1928 in his GN "Spider". Starting in 1923, numerous class awards were introduced, at first for different engine capacities but later also dividing cars into touring, sports and racing types as well. Starting in 1926, it was decided to hold two events per year, with the closed competition taking place at the earlier meeting, and the open event later in the year.

==== Shelsley Walsh winners from 1923 to 1929 ====
Year	Date	Type	Winner on Time Driver (Make)	Time (seconds)
1923	8 September	Open	R. Mays (Bugatti)	52.4^{B}
1923	8 September	Closed	R. Mays (Bugatti)	52.4^{B}
1924	19 July	Open	C. Paul (Beardmore)	50.5
1925	23 May	Open	H.O.D. Segrave (Sunbeam)	53.8
1926	July	Closed	E.R. Hall (Vauxhall)^{C}	56.6
1926	4 September	Open	B.H. Davenport (Frazer Nash)^{C}	48.8
1927	2 July	Closed	B.H. Davenport (Frazer Nash)	50.0
1927	24 September	Open	B.H. Davenport (Frazer Nash)	47.8
1928	5 May	Closed	B.H. Davenport (Frazer Nash)	46.8
1928	28 July	Open	B.H. Davenport (Frazer Nash)	46.2
1929	May	Closed	B.H. Davenport (Frazer Nash)	46.2
1929	14 September	Open	R. Mays (Vauxhall-Villiers)	45.6

^B Raymond Mays improved his time to 51.9 seconds later in the day but this was not considered to be official.
^C Due to rain the unlimited racing cars did not set times, with their runs postponed to the already scheduled September meeting. Davenport's time in the September meeting won both the Open meeting and the postponed Amateur unlimited racing class.

=== 1930s ===
The 1930s were a golden era for Shelsley. The decade began with some notable changes. Most important of these was that the Open meeting for 1930 would count towards the first European Hill Climbing Championship. As a result, it was decided to move the Open date to July, with the Amateur meeting taking the September date. It was also decided that the track should be resurfaced, now sprayed with bitumen. The two most important international competitors at this meeting were Hans Stuck in an Austro Daimler and Rudolf Caracciola in a Mercedes SSK sports car of the type he raced to win the 1929 RAC Tourist Trophy. Stuck was able to significantly lower Raymond May's record time to 42.8 seconds, taking fastest time of the day, with Caracciola setting fastest time for a sports car but finding the running difficult in such a large car. Both Germans would go on to win their respective 1930 Hill Climbing Championships.

For 1931 the Open event was again a part of the European Championship but few international entries were received. In the end just two foreign cars were entered, both factory Nacional Pescaras. As drivers Zanelli and Tort understood little English and had never been before, they had difficulty finding the track and were late to arrive. Although they were unprepared, new to the track and had to make numerous changes to gear ratios, the Nacional Pescaras set times of 44.4 and 44.6 seconds respectively. Fastest time of the day went to R.G.J. Nash in a Frazer Nash "The Terror" with 43.3 seconds, with Mays a fifth of a second slower in his Vauxhall.

Prior to the June 1932 Open meeting, a large rain-storm caused significant damage to the track. However although it was initially feared the 1932 season would need to be cancelled, a large team of volunteers were able to have the track ready in time. The only international entry for 1932 attracted great interest as it was a four-wheel-drive Bugatti, entered by the factory and to be driven by Ettore Bugatti's son Jean. Unfortunately Jean crashed the car during a practice run and had to use a borrowed conventional Bugatti for the event itself. 1932 also saw the introduction of a live radio broadcast by the BBC at Open events, which would run throughout the rest of the 1930s.

From 1933 the two annual events were placed on equal footing as Open events, and it was at the second of these, in September that Stuck's record was finally broken first by Mays in Riley in 42.2 seconds, then by eventual fastest time of the day winner Whitney Straight in 41.2 seconds in his Maserati. Straight would lower his record to 40.0 seconds at the following June 1934 meeting.

It was Mays who was first to break 40 seconds, at the May 1935 meeting. He set a time of 39.8 seconds in his 1.5 litre ERA but later improved this slightly to 39.6 in his 2-litre ERA. For the June 1936 meeting Hans Stuck made his return, this time in a 16-cylinder Auto Union. The weather was wet however, and he was unable to even match the time he set in 1930, with a best time of 45.2. Fellow German Walter Baumer set a time of 42.6 in an Austin, a new 750cc record and just a second slower than fastest time of the day winner Mays. For the September 1936 meeting new timing apparatus were installed, allowing timing to the one-hundredth of a second rather than the one-tenth previously. However due to very poor weather times were not improved. At the next meeting however (June 1937), in good weather Mays was able to lower his record to 39.09 in the first event to take place over two days.

At the last meeting before World War II, in June 1939, Mays set a new record of 37.37 seconds in his ERA R4D.

==== Shelsley Walsh winners from 1930 to 1939 ====
Year	Date	Winner on Time Driver (Make)	Time (seconds)
1930	12 July	H. Stuck (Austro Daimler)	42.8
1930	4 September	Raymond Mays (Vauxhall-Villiers)	46.4
1931	11 July	R.G.J. Nash (Frazer Nash)	43.3
1931	4 September	Raymond Mays (Vauxhall-Villiers)	46.0
1932	June	Earl Howe (Bugatti)	44.0
1932	3 September	R.G.J. Nash (Frazer Nash)	43.2
1933	27 May	Raymond Mays (Vauxhall-Villiers)	44.8
1933	30 September	Whitney Straight (Maserati)	41.2
1934	11 June	Whitney Straight (Maserati)	40.0
1934	29 September	Raymond Mays (ERA)	44.0
1935	18 May	Raymond Mays (ERA)	39.6
1935	28 September	Raymond Mays (ERA)	39.6
1936	6 June	Raymond Mays (ERA)	41.6
1936	12 September	Raymond Mays (ERA)	43.31
1937	5 June	Raymond Mays (ERA)	39.09
1937	11 September	A.F.P. Fane (Frazer Nash)	38.77
1938	28 May	Raymond Mays (ERA)	38.90
1938	10 September	Raymond Mays (ERA)	37.86
1939	3 June	Raymond Mays (ERA)	37.37

=== Post war ===
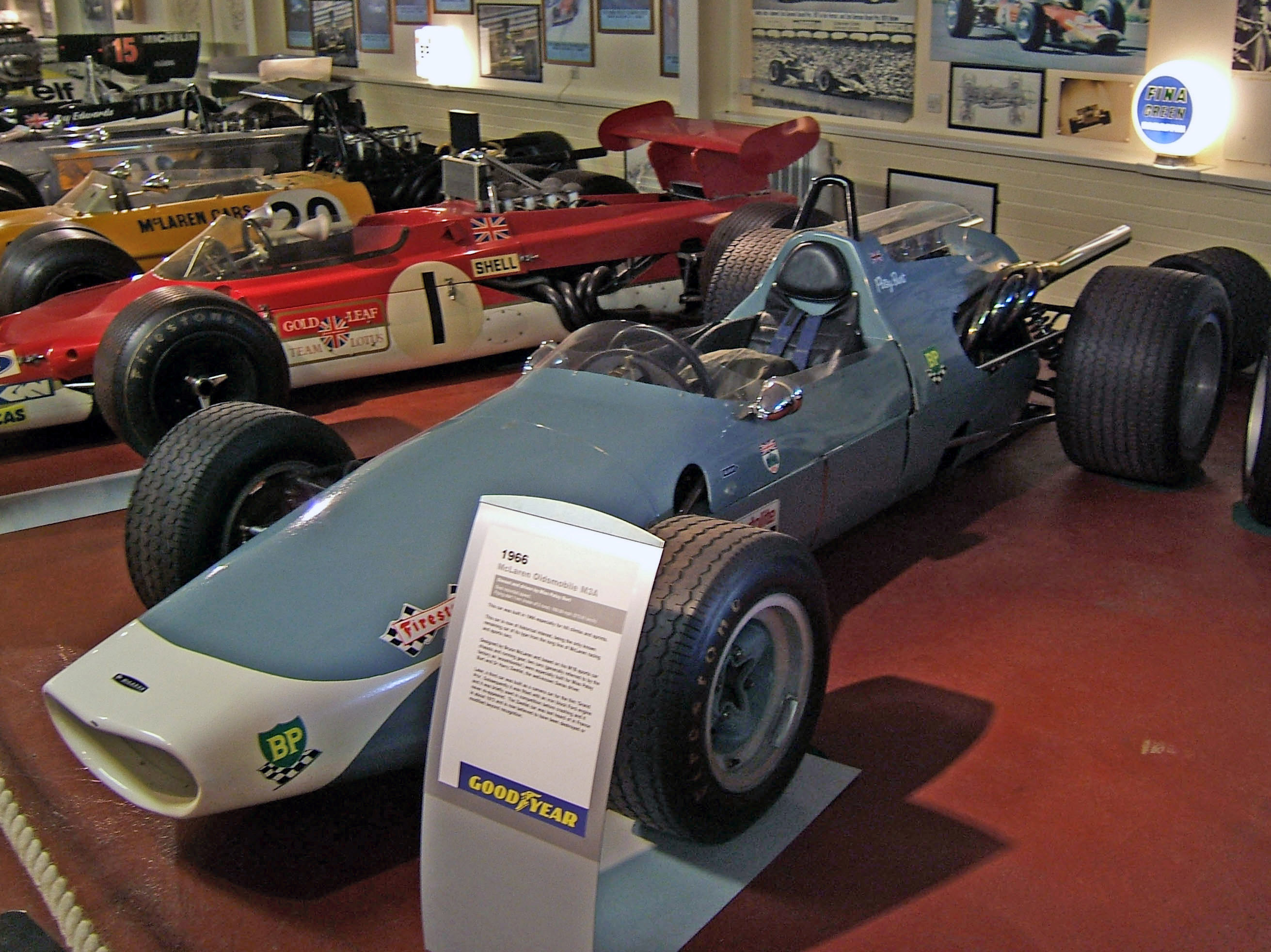
Patsy Burt's 360 bhp McLaren-Oldsmobile, holder of the ladies' course record from 1967 to 1978. Ron Smith, Patsy Burt's then chief mechanic invented the, now compulsory, Burt strut timing bar.

Hillclimbing resumed at the track in 1947, and the 1950s saw a move from Saturday to Sunday meetings, despite protests from, among others, the Lord's Day Observance Society. Several Formula One drivers competed regularly at Shelsley in this era, among them four-time British Hill Climb Championship winner Ken Wharton who broke the hill record on four occasions, and Tony Marsh. The young Stirling Moss would have made his competition debut at Shelsley in 1947, but the entry list was full; he had to be content with a win in 1948.

The first sub-30 second climb at Shelsley was made by David Hepworth in 1971 in his own four-wheel-drive Hepworth FF, and little by little the outright record was chipped away - particularly by Alister Douglas-Osborn, who broke it no fewer than eight times between 1976 and 1983 - until Richard Brown brought it down to 25.34 seconds in 1992. However, an increasingly uneven surface made smooth runs more difficult, and around the start of the 21st century, the 25 second barrier had still not been broken. Meanwhile, the MAC had the much more pressing problem of its future to confront.

=== 2000 to date ===
The land on which the course is run does not belong to the MAC, but is rather leased from a local landowner. The original lease, taken out in 1905, ran for the common length of 99 years - which meant that a solution was urgently needed if 2004 was not to mark the end of hillclimbing at the venue. The owners of the land would not consider selling it outright, but were prepared to extend the lease (by a further 99 years). This, however, would cost a very substantial sum of money, and so the MAC launched the Shelsley Trust, with the aim of raising over a million pounds in order to secure the future of hillclimbing at Shelsley. This target was achieved, and the new lease signed in 2005.

For nine years, the track record had stood at 25.34 seconds and many wondered when it would fall again and who could beat the record. The Scottish driver Graeme Wight Jr was the first to achieve the feat, in 2002, and he collected the £1,000 prize which had been put up for the first driver to dip under 25 seconds with a run of 24.85 seconds. The record was lowered several more times in the next few years, including two records in 2008 by three-time reigning champion Martin Groves. In the June meeting, he took the record down to 22.71 seconds and then shaved 0.13 seconds off that record in the August meeting to set the record at 22.58 seconds.

At the meeting on 11 June 2021, a memorial plaque to Stirling Moss was unveiled, highlighting the fact that he first competed on the course as a teenager in 1948. Also present for the occasion were Joe Dunn, editor of Motor Sport, Moss' biographer, Philip Porter, and Moss' personal Jaguar XK120.

In August 2021 the long standing outright hill record was beaten by Sean Gould with the new mark set at 22.37 seconds. Alex Summers was close behind with 22.52 and Wallace Menzies with 22.55 seconds. Later that day Nicola Menzies set a new lady's record of 24.70 seconds.

In June 2026 Will Hall further reduced the record to a 22.33, at round 10 of the 2026 British Hillclimb Championship.

== See also ==
- Brighton Speed Trials, also first run in 1905.
