= Burt strut =

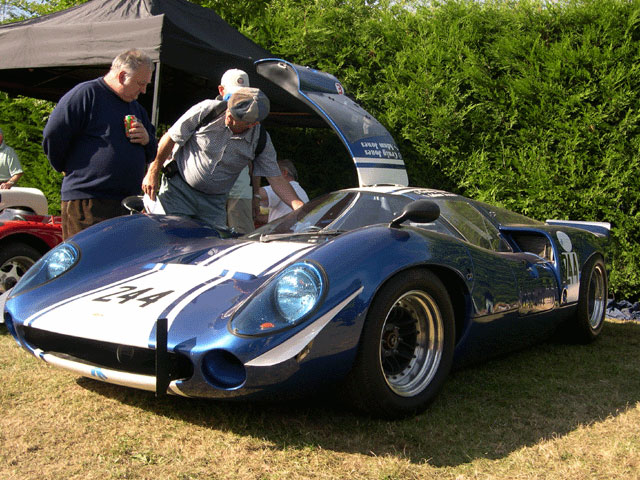
A Burt strut fixed to the front of a Lola T70, in the paddock of the Shelsley Walsh Speed Hill Climb.

A Burt strut, also known as a timing strut or beam splitter, is a black, rectangular plate attached to the front of a competition vehicle, usually a racing car, to provide a standardised, repeatable method by which to break a timing light beam at the start and finish of events timed to high-degrees of accuracy. These events are commonly those in which competitors race against the clock, rather than physically against another vehicle, such as sprint or hillclimb races. The strut was invented in 1967 by Ron Smith; manager, chief mechanic and future husband to 1970 British sprint champion Patsy Burt. As the strut made its first appearance on the front of Burt's McLaren-Oldsmobile her name was used as its official title. In recent years the generic term timing strut has also become common.

The Burt strut was introduced to replace previous timing mechanisms, whereby a chock with a sensor was placed behind the rear wheel of a car at the start. Due to the chock being related to the rear of the car at the start, and readings being taken from the front of the car at the finish, the degree of precision within which cars could be timed was limited. As most British hillclimb courses are somewhat less than 1500 yards (1372 m) long, it is not uncommon for competitors' times to be separated by only a few hundredths of a second. The introduction of more accurate light beam timing required that all cars provide a consistent surface with which to break the beam at both start and finish of the timed section. However, owing to the variable shape of vehicles and inconsistencies in the placing of the beam sensors, this was not a simple condition to meet before the introduction of the Burt strut.

The Burt strut has since been made compulsory in most national and international timed sprint events. Within the United Kingdom the rules governing the size and position of the strut are determined by the Royal Automobile Club Motor Sports Association. The strut is currently defined in the MSA Competitors' Yearbook (the Blue Book) regulations document as being a single rectangular plate, painted matt black on both sides, no less than 254 mm (10.0 in) in height and 51 mm (2.0 in) in width, the lower edge of which should be mounted not more than 200 mm (7.9 in) from the ground, with the upper edge being at least 454 mm (17.9 in) from the ground. The strut must be the most forward part of the vehicle. There are no restrictions on the material used to make the strut, so long as the strut itself conforms to the regulations, and some designs can be very simple to construct.
