= Patsy Burt =

British racing driver

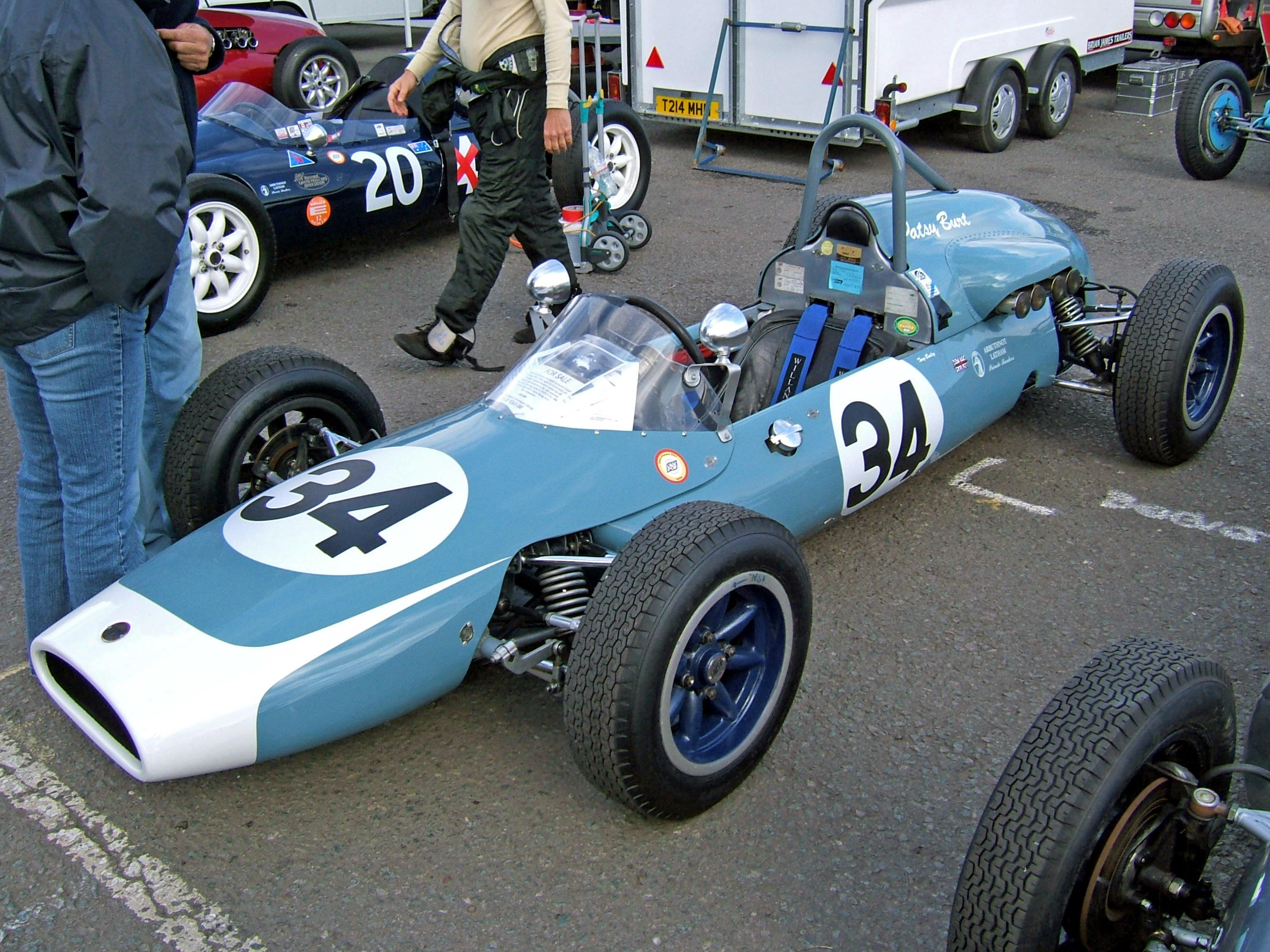
Patsy Burt's iconic Cooper T59 car, recently restored and resplendent in her Burt blue racing livery.

Patricia Mary Burt (10 July 1928, Chelsea, London – 4 October 2001) was a British motor racing driver.

During a long and varied career, Patsy Burt won many British national-level competitions, and was the first female driver ever to win the Brighton Speed Trials and the RAC National Sprint Championship. Her run at Brighton in 1968 set a new outright course record, which went unbeaten until 1975. She was also, in 1961, the first British driver of either sex to participate in a full season of the European Mountain Championship. For nearly three decades, Patsy Burt's powder-blue racing cars were a familiar sight, usually placed well up the leader board, at most British hillclimb and sprint races.

Her 42 outright victories and nearly 100 national, international, and ladies' records make Patsy Burt one of the most successful British female racing drivers of all time. Her achievements earned her membership of the British Racing Drivers' Club, an institution few women are ever invited to join.

== Early career ==
Patsy Burt's introduction to motor sport was through her father, Eric Burt, who was himself an accomplished racing driver. After initially disliking visits to the Brooklands circuit to watch her father and others competing on the high speed Surrey banking, following World War II she trained as a riding instructor. However, she remained in contact with motor racing through her father's involvement with the Junior Car Club, and occasionally spectated at the Goodwood Circuit, one of Britain's few post-war motor racing venues. Eventually she was tempted into taking part herself, and began her driving career at the wheel of a Jowett Javelin in 1953.

Initially her driving was restricted to rallying and driving tests, through which she eventually earned works drives for a number of manufacturers including BMC, Triumph and Ford. However, it was not long before she also began to take part in circuit races, and she worked her way up from her Javelin firstly to a Jaguar XK120, and then an Aston Martin DB2/4. It was while driving the Aston at Goodwood in 1955 that she overheard a male spectator's comment that she would later cite as a major motivating factor in her future career: "Look, a woman driving. Oh, what a waste of a beautiful motor car".

The next season Patsy Burt exchanged her road cars for some proper competition machinery. She competed in a few hillclimb and circuit events in an Aston Martin DB3S, and the following year bought a Cooper T39 "Bobtail" sport racer. It was with Coopers that Patsy Burt's name would become most associated over the subsequent decade.

== Single-seat racing career ==
In 1958 Patsy Burt made the step up to single-seat Formula racing, and bought a Cooper T43. Although she continued to compete in circuit races, Burt won her first events in hillclimb competitions, including taking first place in the Stapleford National Hillclimb. From 1959 she decided to concentrate solely on the sprint and hillclimb events. Her smooth, precise driving style was ideally suited to these single-run events where a mistake, unlike in a multiple-lap circuit race, could not be cancelled out by better driving later in the event. In addition to the little Cooper – painted in her own shade of dark powder-blue, which came to be known by others as Burt blue, with white trim – Patsy Burt also raced a 1500 cc Porsche RS in 1961, becoming the first British competitor ever to complete a full season in the European Mountain Championship.

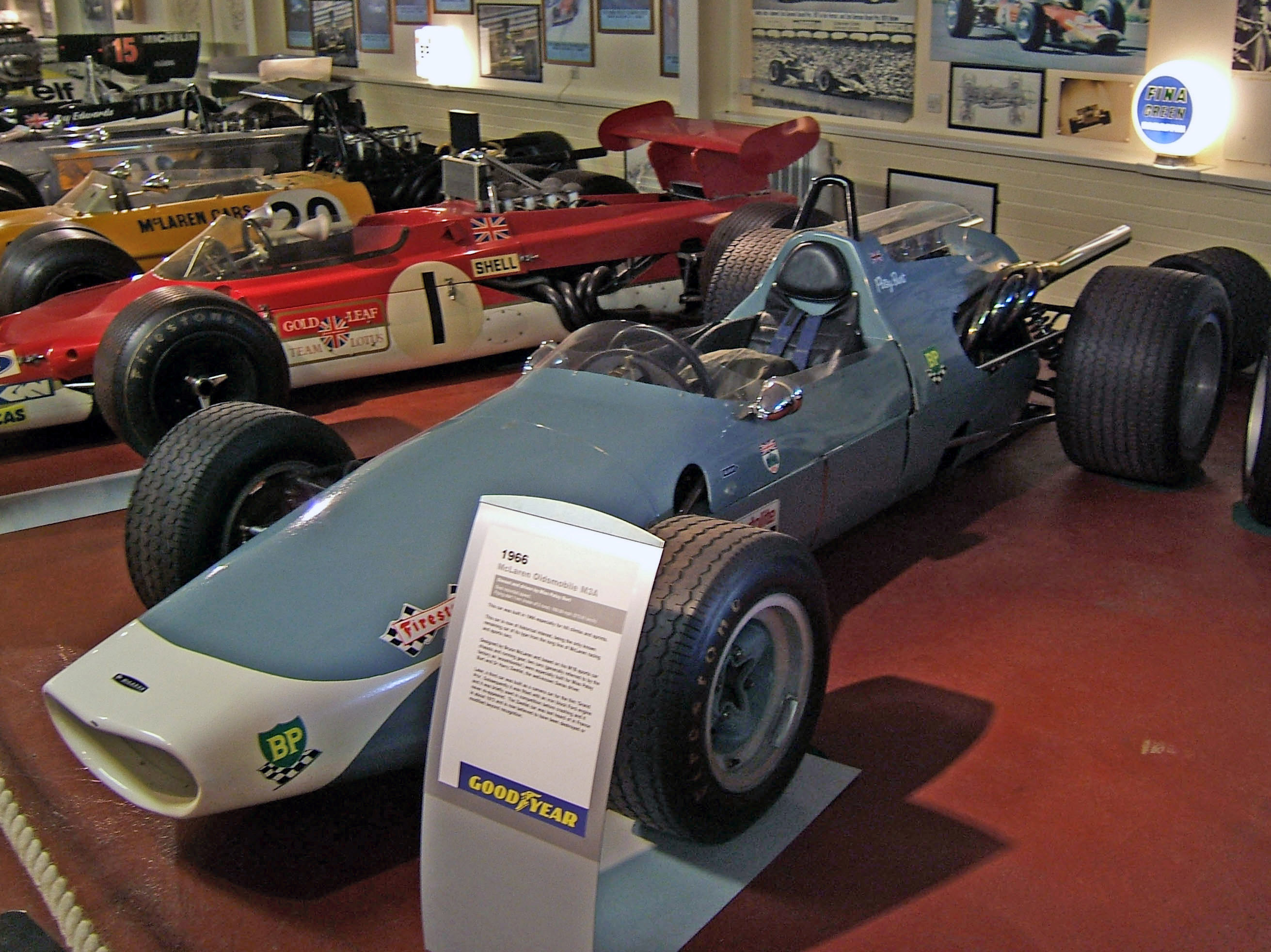
Patsy Burt's Oldsmobile-engined McLaren M3A, on display in the Donington Grand Prix Collection.

As well as being a successful racer herself, Patsy Burt and her manager Ron Smith also ran a well-regarded race preparation garage. Their operation, PMB Garages Ltd. (PMB being Burt's initials), of Great Bookham, Surrey, prepared Arthur Owen's winning Cooper T53 car for the 1962 British Hill Climb Championship, and repeated their triumph eight years later with Sir Nick Williamson's F5000 specification McLaren M10A. PMB were, naturally, also responsible for Patsy Burt's own cars during the rest of her career. The car with which Burt became synonymous, her modified Cooper T59, was built up at PMB Garages in the winter of 1962–63. Chassis number C/PMB/1/63, originally supplied as a 1-litre Formula Junior car, was adapted to accept a 2-litre Coventry Climax FPF engine by moving the driving position forward. Burt's short stature allowed the larger engine, with its concomitantly larger fuel and oil tanks, to be mounted in the usual position without having to lengthen the car's wheelbase.

Patsy Burt accelerates away from the start line at Elvington airfield in 1968 in her McLaren M3A. The car is fitted with special low-drag nose and extended canopy modifications, and sports a Burt strut timing device on the nose tip.

Burt continued to participate, with great success, in British events throughout the early 1960s, but by 1965 both she and Smith realised that, if her success was to continue, she needed a more potent mount. Being acquainted with McLaren founder Bruce McLaren, Burt and Smith approached him with an idea for creating a single-seater from the McLaren M1A Can-Am sports car's chassis. McLaren liked the idea and the resultant McLaren M3A was nicknamed the whoosh-bonk, as when the idea was first pitched to him his response was that building it should be a quick process: "whoosh, bonk, and we've got a single-seater!" The M3A appeared in 1966 and was a brutally effective sprint machine, boasting a 4.4 litres (269 cu in) Oldsmobile V8 engine, modified by Traco to produce 360 bhp (268 kW), comparable with the best contemporary Formula One machines. For certain sprint events PMB Garages modified the McLaren with a pointed nose and extended windscreen, designed to reduce aerodynamic drag.

The M3A was not the only technological contribution that Burt and Smith made to the hillclimbing world. In 1967 Burt's M3A was the first car to employ a vertical metal plate mounted edge-on to the direction of travel, intended to provide a reliable surface with which to break the timing beam at the start and finish of sprint and hillclimb courses. This plate eventually became compulsory in international competition and is now known as a Burt strut, making Patsy Burt one of the few racers to have a component named after them.

Behind the wheel of her M3A Patsy Burt set eight international and 21 British national records for various events and distances, from both a standing and flying start. The M3A's first major win was in 1967 at the Shelsley Walsh Speed Hill Climb, Britain's oldest hillclimb event, where she set a ladies' course record time. In 1968 she won the Brighton Speed Trials sprint event on Brighton's historic Madeira Drive. In so doing she set a 1 km course record which stood for seven years. The high point of her career came in 1970 when she won the RAC National Sprint Championship, the first time that a woman had ever won a British national title. Keen to end her career on top of her profession, Patsy Burt retired from driving at the end of the 1970 season. Over the course of her career, Burt scored 42 outright victories and took 172 class wins, in addition to 151 ladies' prizes.

== Life after driving ==
After her retirement from active competition Patsy Burt and Ron Smith continued to run PMB Garages. In 1972 they were again involved in preparing the British Hill Climb Champion's car: Nick Williamson's March 712. Following this final triumph the pair retired from active competition, to throw themselves into organisational and consulting roles. After having been partners for many years, Patsy Burt and Ron Smith married in 1983. Patsy Burt's Cooper T59 was on display in the National Motor Museum for many years, before being recently restored and returned to the race track. Her McLaren M3A, the first of its kind and last known survivor of the three eventually built, found its way to the Donington Grand Prix Collection. Patsy Burt died on 4 October 2001; her death notice in The Daily Telegraph read "on her 73rd lap retired due to a mechanical problem..."

Sporting positions
Preceded by None	British Sprint Champion; 1970	Succeeded by Jonty Williamson
