= Godfrey-Proctor =

Defunct British car manufacturer

Godfrey-Proctor, (Godfrey and Proctor), was a British car manufacturer (circa late 1920s-1928) founded by Henry Ronald Godfrey (H.R. Godfrey) and Stuart Proctor at Richmond, Surrey in England. Godfrey left G.N. (Godfrey-Nash) to form H.R. Godfrey Motors, providing G.N. spares and rebuilds, which evolved into Godfrey and Proctor who both serviced GN's and produced their own car based on the Austin 7. About 10 cars had been produced when the company ceased trading in 1928.

Godfrey went on to found the HRG Engineering Company in 1935 and S.R.Proctor joined in 1950 as technical director, replacing original partner Guy Robbins.
