= Henry Ronald Godfrey =

Ronald Godfrey (1887–1968), full name Henry Ronald Godfrey, was an English motor car design engineer of the first half of the 20th century possibly best known for his successful Singer-engined H R G thoroughbred sports cars built between 1935 and 1956.

== Apprenticeship ==
Born near London, Ron met Archie Nash at London's Finsbury Technical School and after obtaining his City & Guilds diploma in Mechanical Engineering he completed an apprenticeship at Willans & Robinson in Rugby, Warwickshire where the slightly younger Archie soon followed him to do the same training.

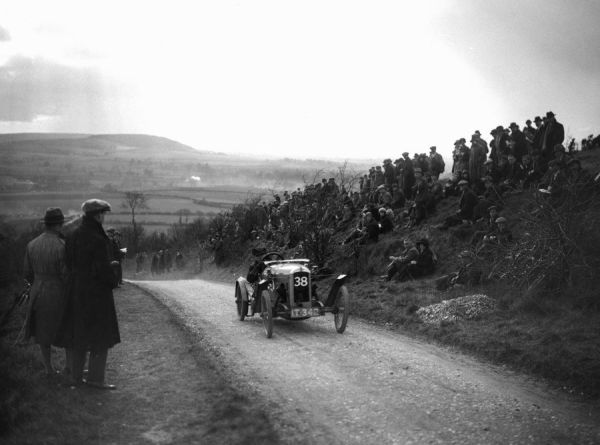
Godfrey driving GN at 1922 Essex Motor Club Kop hillclimb

== G N ==
Godfrey and Nash then got together to produce the GN cycle car. A light-weight 90 degree Vee-twin-cylinder car first sold in 1911, it stayed in production through 1922. Ron Godfrey's major contribution was his design of the engine and chain transmission.

== H R Godfrey Motors ==
When Archie Nash left the company in 1922 to form Frazer-Nash Godfrey left to provide a repair business H R Godfrey Motors to supply GN spares. They also offered rebuilds. This enterprise formed the basis of his partnership with Stuart Proctor, with whom he formed Godfrey-Proctor. Continuing the servicing of GN's, they produced their own car based on the Austin Seven, but the venture was unsuccessful, with only about 10 cars produced by the time the company ceased trading in 1928.

== Nash & Thompson ==
In 1929 Ron joined a new partnership with Archie Nash in Kingston-upon-Thames, Nash & Thompson. It was described as contractors and armament engineers for the Admiralty and the Air Ministry. Archie designed the hydraulic gun turret that was to be widely used in World War II. In 1935 Archie Nash took this business into Parnall Aircraft and Ron Godfrey moved to a new enterprise.

== H R G Engineering ==
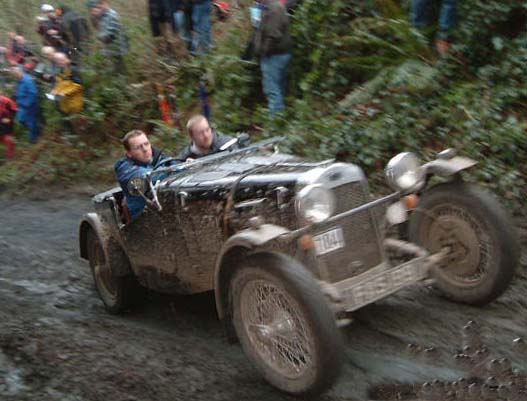
1954 HRG with Volvo engine

In 1935, having raced at Brooklands, Ron Godfrey formed HRG Engineering (initial letters Halford Robins Godfrey) with Major E J "Ted" Halford and Guy Herbert Robins, who was previously with Trojan. H R G was based in Norbiton, with the first prototype shown at the end of 1935. Fully established in 1936, the company produced cars until 1956, and then reverted to development engineering work for others, before ceasing trading in 1966.

Their H R G car was a small true sports car in the vintage tradition sold at a realistic price. The prototype used a Meadows ED engine with a strengthened crankshaft. It could exceed 85 mph and handled excellently on the road. From 1939 the Meadows engine was replaced with a 1½ litre overhead camshaft Singer engine. When Ronald retired he had a very advanced new car on the drawing board but it was never put into production.

== British Automobile Racing Club ==
H R Godfrey was a founder member of the British Automobile Racing Club.

Ron Godfrey retired in 1958 to a nearby water mill which he took great pleasure in rebuilding. He died in 1968.
