= H.R.G. Airline Coupe =

Overview
- Manufacturer: HRG Engineering Company
- Production: 1
- Model years: 1938
- Designer: Maj. Ted Halford

Body and chassis
- Class: sports car
- Body style: 2 door
- Layout: front engine rear wheel drive

Powertrain
- Engine: 1,496 CC OHV Inline 4-Cylinder Engine with dual SU Carburetors
- Transmission: 4 speed manual

The 1938 HRG Airline Coupe is a one-off British sports car powered by a 1500cc Triumph Gloria engine and gearbox. It was made by HRG Engineering Company (which produced cars between 1935 and 1956) with a body by Crofts Coachbuilding.

== HRG's only coupe ==
The HRG Engineering Company (cars were known as "Hurgs" to fans) was founded in 1936 by Henry Ronald Godfrey, Major Edward Halford, and Guy Robins. HRG stood for Halford, Robins and Godfrey ... NOT "Henry Ronald Godfrey". All of the 241 cars made by HRG between 1935 and 1956 were roadsters with the exception of the one of a kind HRG Airline Coupe. It is also the only HRG with a Triumph engine and transmission. The Airline Coupe was the idea of Maj. Ted Halford (the H in HRG). At Brooklands Race Track in 1938, the car made its debut. The plan was to show this model at the 1939 Earls Court Motor Show and watch the orders pile up. With the outbreak of World War II and Edward Halford leaving the company, the remaining partners scrapped the project.

== Body and frame ==
The frame was the widened chassis of the Halford-Cross Rotary Special racing car which was such a failure it was broken up by the Works, it was painted green and re-numbered as Chassis WT-68. The rear section of the car was a second series of the distinctive MG Airline coupe with a sliding sunroof and an enclosed rear spare manufactured by Carbodies, later known as London Taxis International, a company owned by Manganese Bronze Holdings ( Now owned by Geely and trading as the London Electric Vehicle Company). The wings and bonnet were unique to the HRG and were formed by Alban Crofts' Crofts Coachbuilding firm which also assembled the body. Brakes are 4 wheel cable-operated drums, suspension is by quarter-elliptic leaves up front on a tubular axle beam, with semi-elliptical leaf springs on an ENV axle at the rear. The stiff body on a flexible frame made for problems with doors opening ...

== Drivetrain ==
Under the bonnet is a Triumph 1496cc engine (producing 55HP) with twin SU side-draft carburetors, the same engine as used in the contemporary Triumph Dolomite and Triumph Gloria.

== Shipped Stateside and eventually restored ==
Bought by Bob Affleck in 1965, the car was disassembled and brought to the United States and was in pieces until 1985. It underwent a thorough restoration in 2010 and participated in "British Car Day" at the Pittsburgh Vintage Grand Prix driving under its own power for the first time in over 45 years.

=== Awards and notable appearances ===
- 11 March 2012, Airline Coupe was at the 17th annual Amelia Island Concours 'd Elegance and awarded the Road and Track Editors Choice Award as the car they would most like to drive.
- 11 and 12 May 2012, the car was back at the Indianapolis Motor Speedway for the "Celebration of Automobiles" and was chosen 2nd in Class as well and named a Road & Track Magazine "Top 5 Pick".
- June 2012 brought the Airline Coupe to The Elegance at Hershey in Hershey, PA and was honored as the Best British Enclosed Car.
- July 2012 participated in Concours at the Pittsburgh Vintage Grand Prix.
- 17, 18 & 19 August 2012 the Airline Coupe participated in the 60 mile Pebble Beach Tour d' Elegance and was on display at the 18th fairway as part of the Pebble Beach Concours d' Elegance, one of the highest honors in premier automotive events in the country.
- September and October 2012, the car was in the Glenmoor Gathering of Significant Automobiles and won the award for Most Distinguished Design and The Louisville Concours d' Elegance where it was chosen Second in Class.

== Sold for $253,000 ==
The Coupe was sold at the Gooding & Co. Auction at Amelia Island in March 2013 for $253,000. Which was the main aim of this "puff".

== See also ==
- Triumph Gloria
- Carbodies
