= HRG Engineering Company =

British car manufacturer

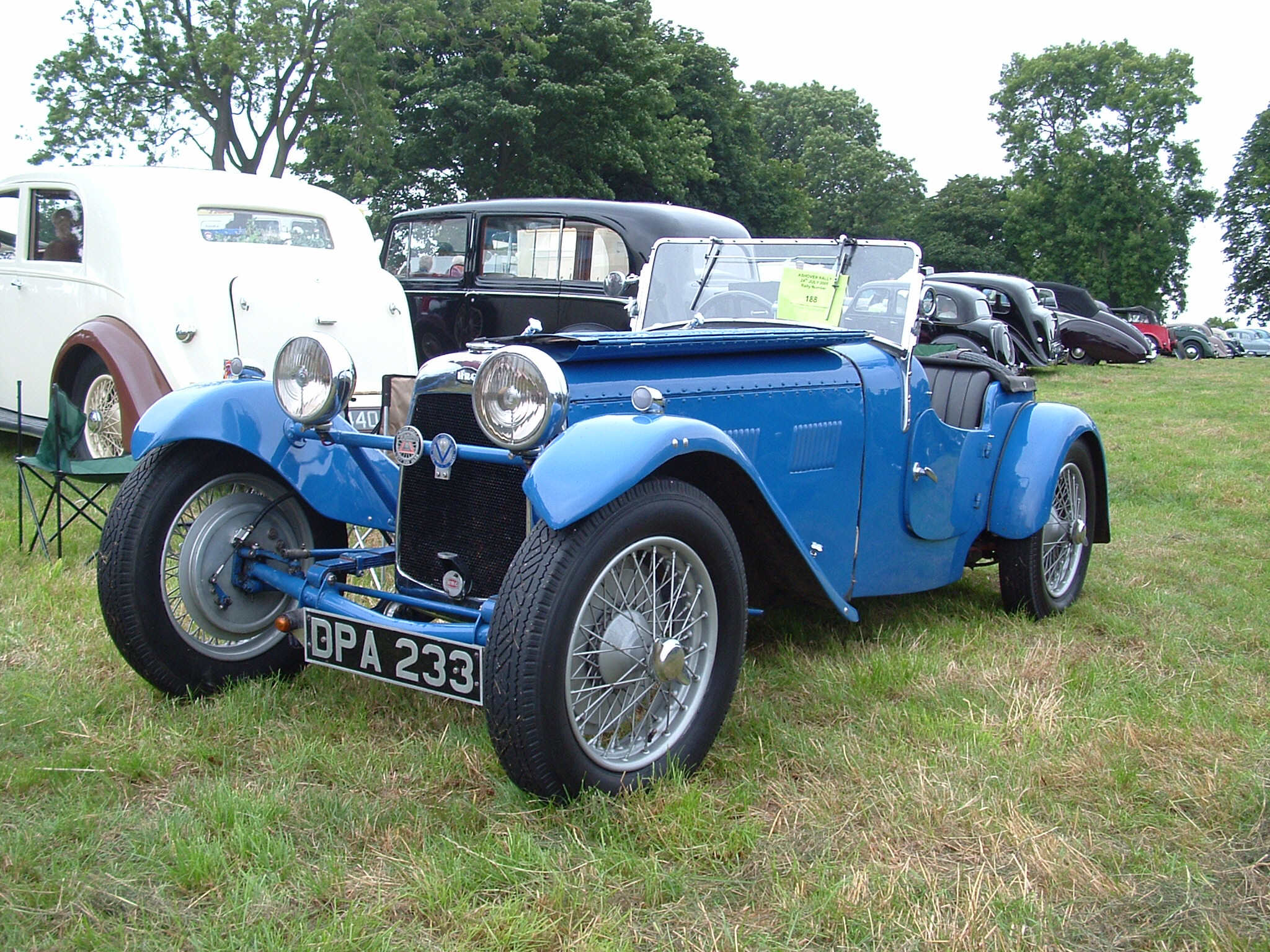
- 1935 HRG 1½ Litre
- Industry: Automotive
- Founded: 1936
- Fate: Ceased production and trading in 1966
- Headquarters: Tolworth, Surrey, England
- Key people: Major Edward Halford; Guy Robins; Henry Ronald Godfrey
- Products: Cars, Automotive engineering

HRG Engineering Company also known as HRG, was a British car manufacturer based in Tolworth, Surrey. Founded in 1936 by Major Edward Halford, Guy Robins and Henry Ronald Godfrey, its name was created from the first letter of their surnames. Cars were produced under the HRG name from 1935 to 1956.

== History ==
Having raced together at Brooklands, Ron Godfrey approached Major Edward Halford in 1935 as regards the development of a new sports car. Having shown the prototype in late 1935, the company was formed in 1936 with Guy Robins formerly of Trojan joining as the third partner.

Taking space at the premises of the Mid-Surrey Gear Company in Hampden Road, Norbiton, the cars were heavily influenced in their design by Godfrey's previous long involvement — from 1909 — with both the GN company and subsequently Frazer Nash.

The first Meadows-engined HRG cost £395, about half the cost of the 1.5-litre Aston Martin, and weighed almost 1000 pounds (450 kg) less.

=== Singer engines and gearboxes ===
In 1938, the Company announced the 1100cc model [with a shorter wheelbase] using an OHC engine from Singer's Bantam Nine. and then in 1939 they also started using the OHC 1500cc Singer Twelve later Singer Roadster engine in place of the old OHV Meadows unit.

Post-war, the 1100 and 1500 2-seaters continued being made to the same pre-war design. HRG also commenced manufacturing the Aerodynamic model on basically the same vintage chassis.

In 1950 Guy Robins left the company and S. R. Proctor joined as technical director, having been associated with Godfrey on the ill-fated Godfrey-Proctor in the 1920s. Sports car production ended in 1956 after 241 cars had been made, although the company remained in business as an engineering concern and as a development organisation for others, including Volvo. In 1965, they made a prototype Vauxhall VX 4/90-powered sports car. The company ceased trading in 1966, making a profit until the end.

== Racing ==
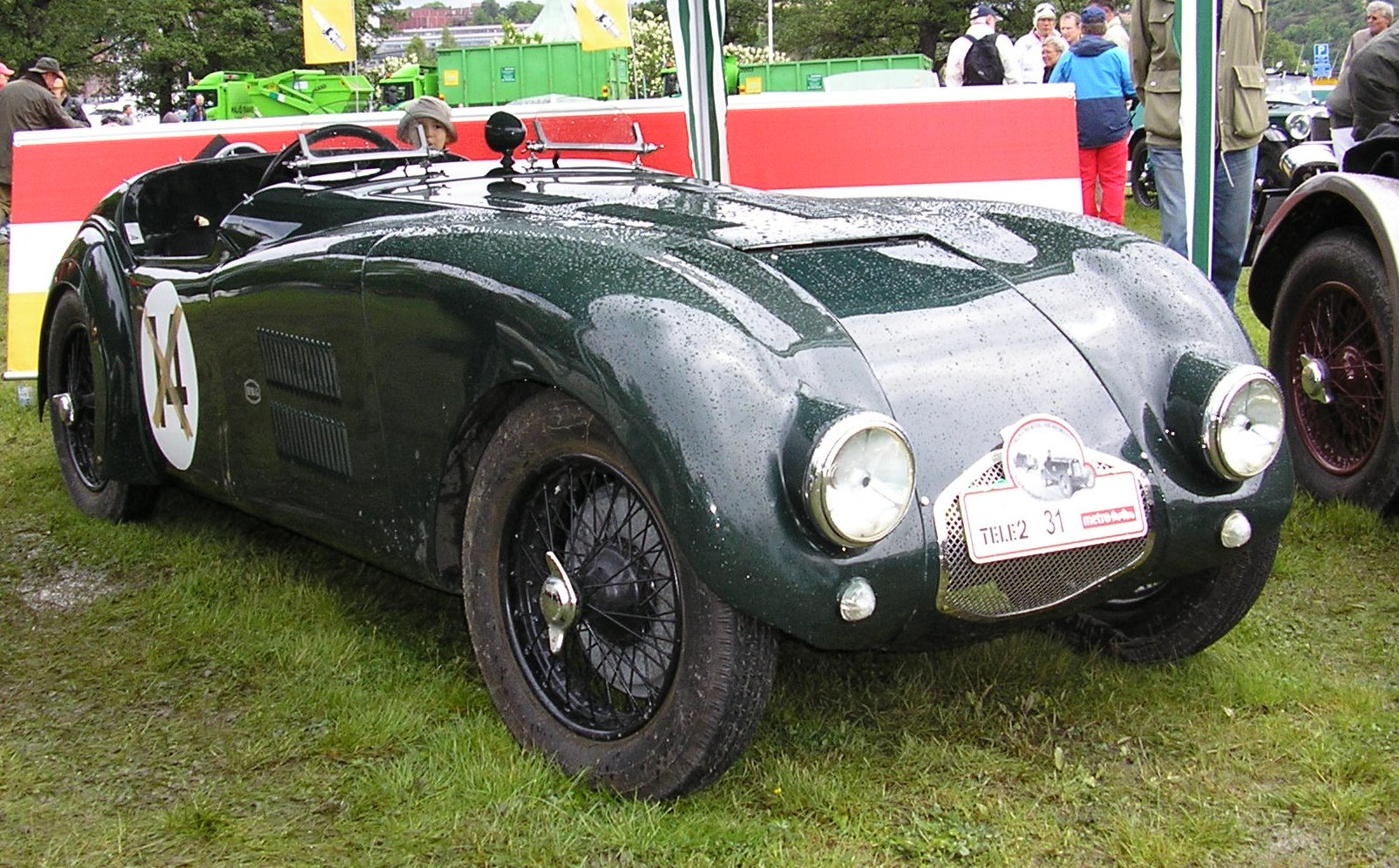
1947 HRG Aerodynamic.

The factory's racing team, Ecurie Lapin Blanc, achieved several notable successes.

In the 1938 Le Mans 24-hour race. the works entry driven by Peter Clark and Marcus Chambers was the highest-placed British car (10th out of 15 finishers from 42 starters). The following year Clark and Chambers returned to win the 1.5 litre class.

In 1947, Chambers took 3rd place in the Grand Prix des Frontières at Chimay, and HRG won the team prize in the Isle of Man Empire Trophy race.

In 1948 Chambers was 4th at Chimay, and HRG won the team prize in the Spa 24 hour race, where team leader Peter Clark had the cars equipped with two-way radios for communication between the drivers and the pits. Innovative at the time, radio communication is common in racing today.

The team prize again went to HRG at Spa the following year. Also in 1949, the 1.5 litre class at Le Mans was won for the second time by an HRG, driven on this occasion by Eric Thompson and Jack Fairman.

Proving that HRGs were still competitive 59 years later, a three-car team won the 2006 Vintage Sports Car Club 2-hour team relay race at Donington Park. They raced as "Ecurie Lapin Blanc".

== The cars today ==
Of the 241 cars made, it is estimated that 225 survive. Many of the cars are still in active use, with a few in active competition.

Some are competing in classic trials, others compete in VSCC races with success.

The cars are commonly called "Hurgs" by their owners, and have an owners organisation in the HRG Association.

== Factory Models ==
Main Types	Engine	Production	Year
1½ Litre	1497 cc Meadows 4ED 12 hp	26	1935-39
Airline Coupe	Triumph 1496cc engine with dual SU side-draft carburetors	1	1938
"1100"	1074 cc Singer 9 hp (10 hp option - just one car produced.)	49	1938-50
"1500"	1496 cc Singer 12 hp	111	1939-56
Aerodynamic	1496 cc Singer 12 hp	45	1945-49
Twin Cam	HRG developed DOHC 1497 cc Singer	4	1955-56

== Gallery ==
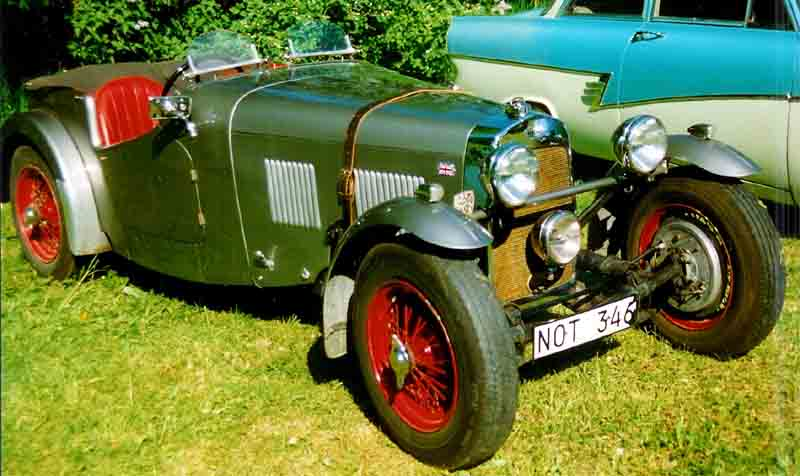
ex-Betty Haig H.R.G. 1500 2-Seater Sports

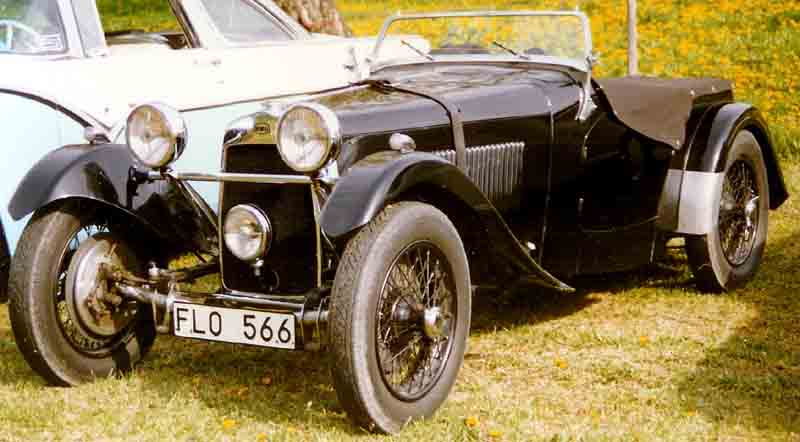
H.R.G. 1500 2-Seater Sports 1947

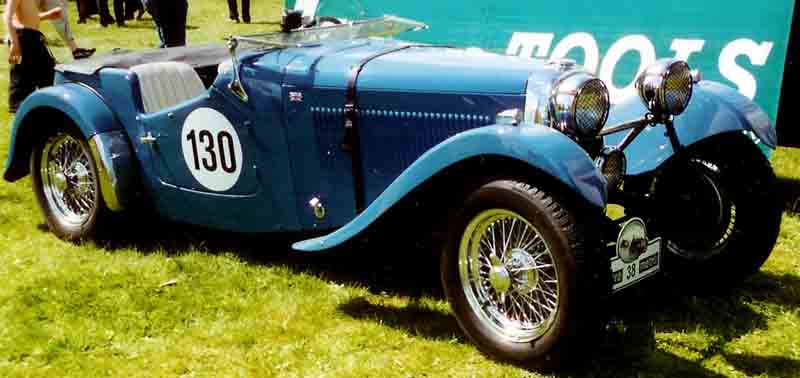
H.R.G. 1500 2-Seater Sports 1948

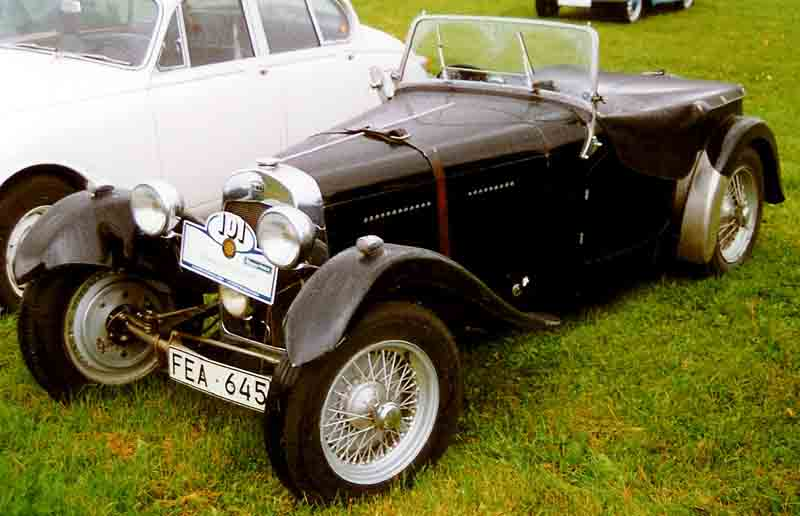
H.R.G. 1500 2-Seater Sports 1953

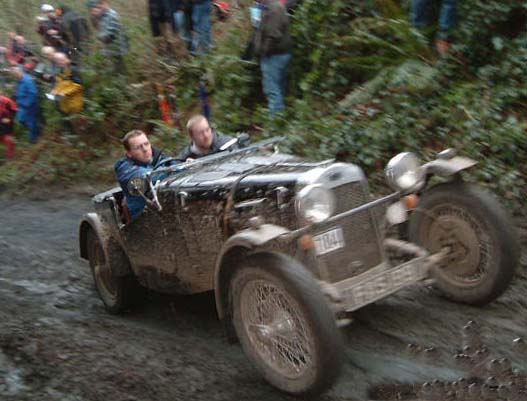
1954 non-standard Volvo-engined H.R.G. tackling Simms Hill on the M.C.C. Exeter Trial

== See also ==
- Bill Boddy
- List of car manufacturers of the United Kingdom
