= Archibald Frazer-Nash =

British automotive designer, inventor, builder; founder of Frazer Nash

Captain Archibald Goodman Frazer Nash M.I.Mech.E.
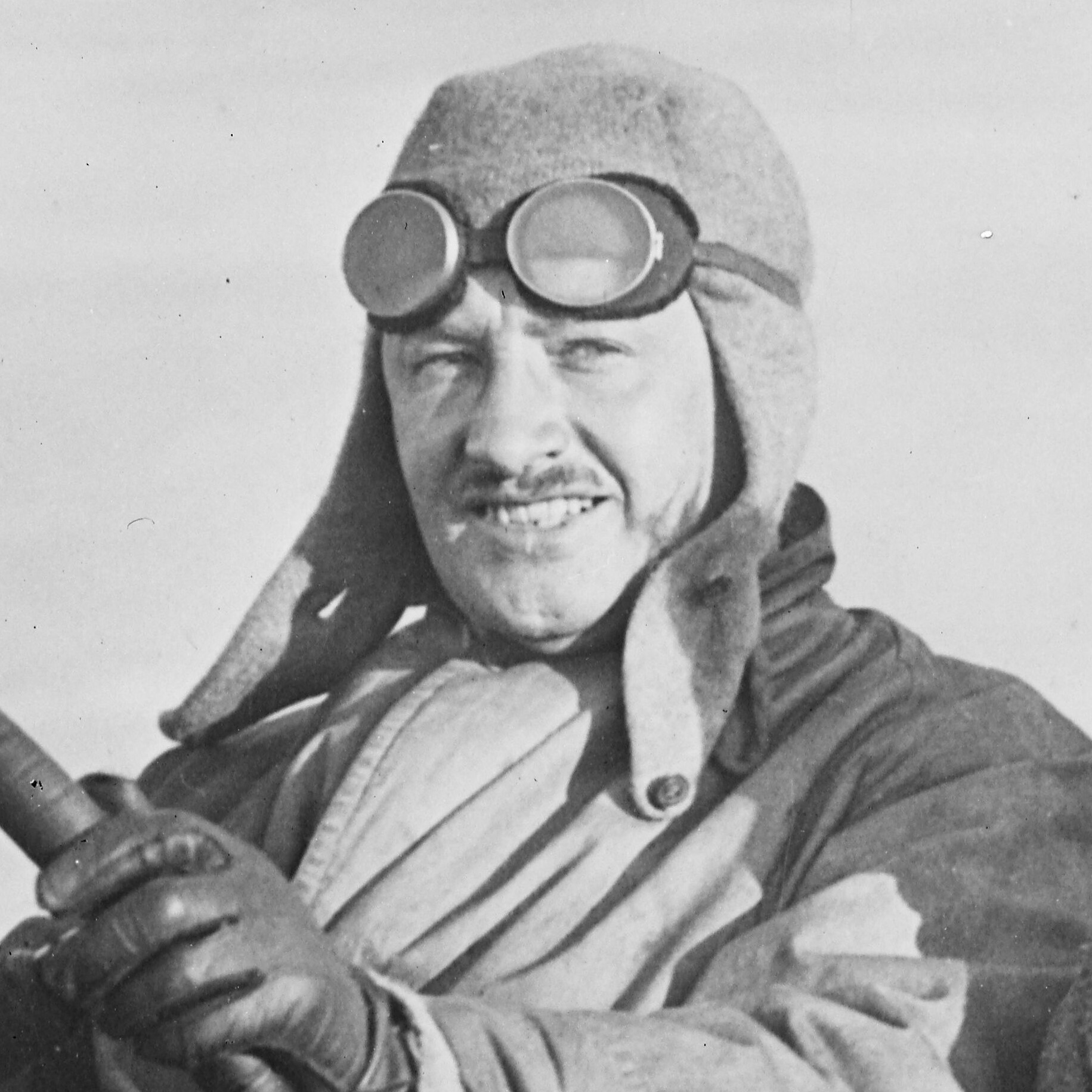
- Born: 30 June 1889; Hyderabad, Sindh
- Died: 10 March 1965 (aged 75)
- Education: Finsbury technical college
- Parent: Lilias Emily Nash (nee Goodman) LRCP
- Engineering career
- Discipline: Automotive and aeronautical engineering
- Institutions: 1911–1922, GN Cars; 1917–1919, RAF Technical Department; 1923–1929, Frazer-Nash cars; 1929-1935, Nash & Thompson; 1935– Parnall Aircraft Limited; –1965 Frazer-Nash Group
- Significant design: Nash Safe-Load Indicator; Frazer-Nash hydraulic gun turret; Frazer Nash Safety Wing-tip Flare Apparatus

Archibald Goodman Frazer Nash (30 June 1889 – 10 March 1965), was an early English motor car designer, engineer, and inventor who specialised in manufacturer of light "cycle cars" and sports cars in England.

Nash added his third name Frazer and a hyphen to his surname in 1938 and so either form may be correct depending on the period.

== Early years ==
Nash was born in Hyderabad, Sindh Province, India (now Pakistan) on 30 June 1889. In 1905, while at Finsbury technical college, he met Henry Ronald Godfrey who later became a business partner in GN cars and Nash & Thompson. After City and Guilds he served an apprenticeship with Willans & Robinson in Rugby.

Nash began an association with the aircraft industry in 1917 and remained in the Technical Department of the Royal Air Force until March 1919. A skilled pilot, he then bought his own Le Rhône-powered Avro aircraft and flew with Godfrey to the Paris Salon.

== Automotive career ==
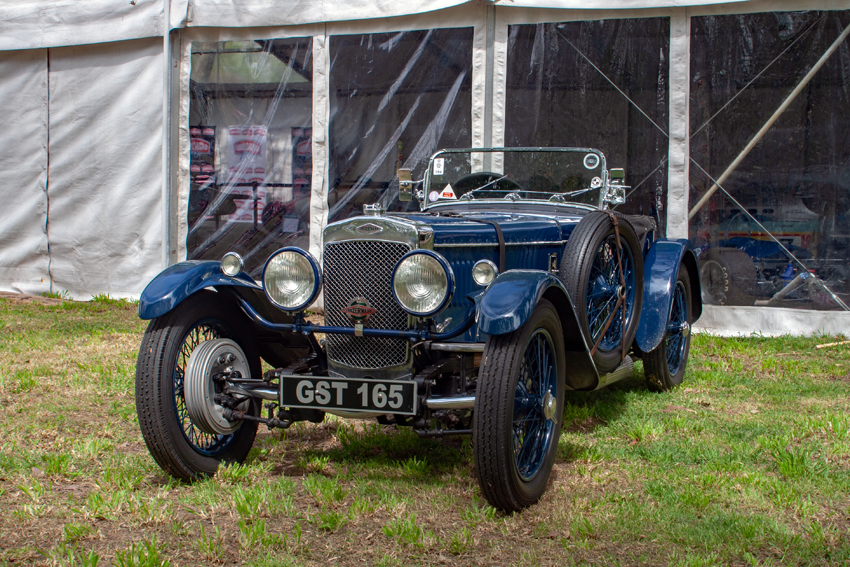
Frazer Nash TT Replica in Buenos Aires

=== GN and Frazer Nash cars ===
In 1910, Nash had partnered with Godfrey to produce the GN cycle car. First sold in 1911, the GN cycle car was a lightweight two-cylinder car that stayed in production (apart from the war years) until 1922 in the UK and 1925 in France, where it was made under licence by Salmson. Frazer Nash's racing successes in highly developed versions of the cars contributed to their popularity.

In 1923, Nash started the Frazer Nash company to produce an evolution of the GN, still chain-driven, which became the Frazer Nash sports car. Frazer Nash Ltd. was reconstituted as AFN Ltd in 1927 and taken over by H.J. ("Aldy" or "HJ") Aldington in 1929. At that time Nash resigned from any management role though he remained a small shareholder and instead devoted himself to his more profitable new engineering business.

== Engineering ==
=== Nash & Thompson ===
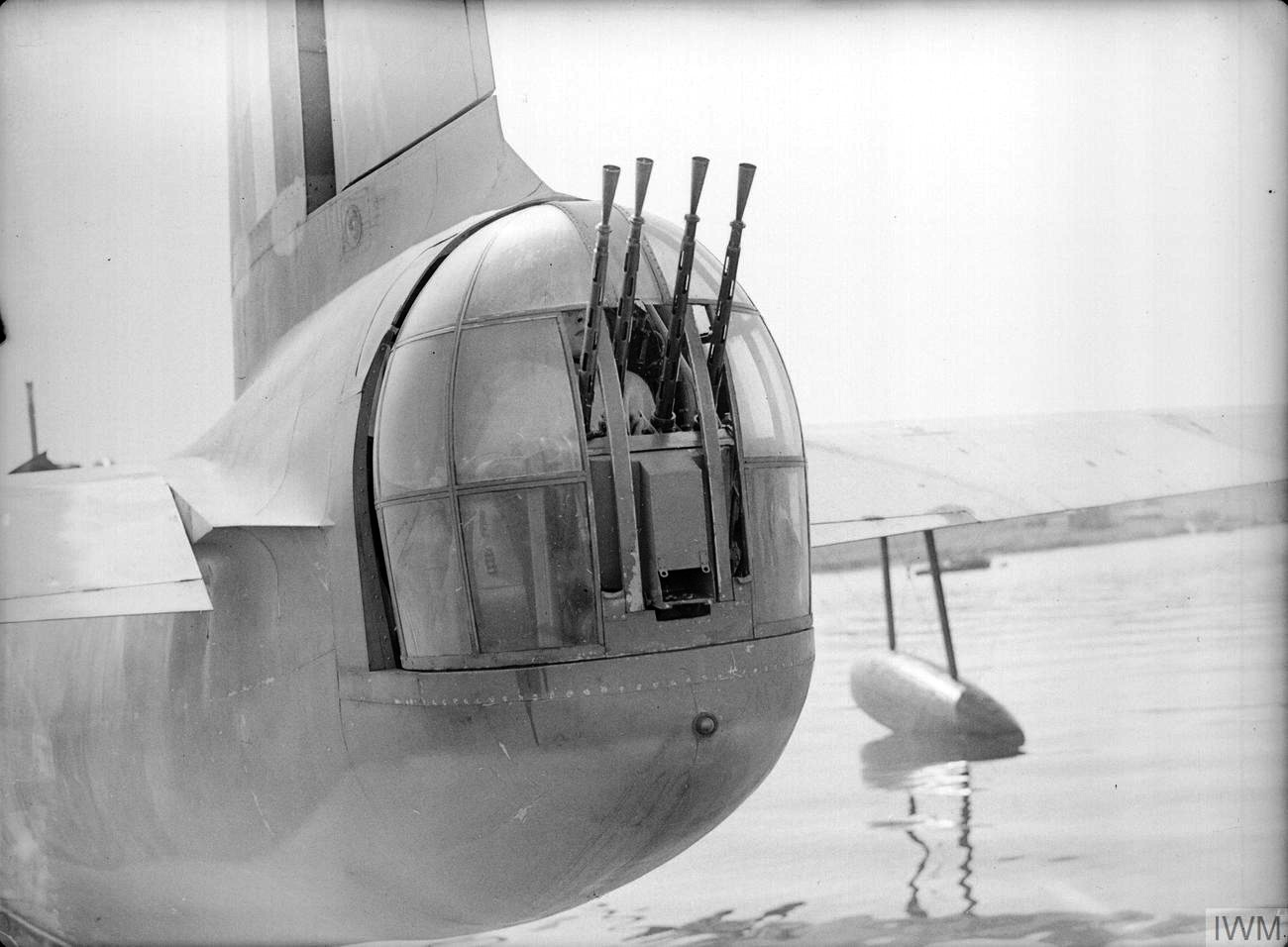
FN-13 tail turret

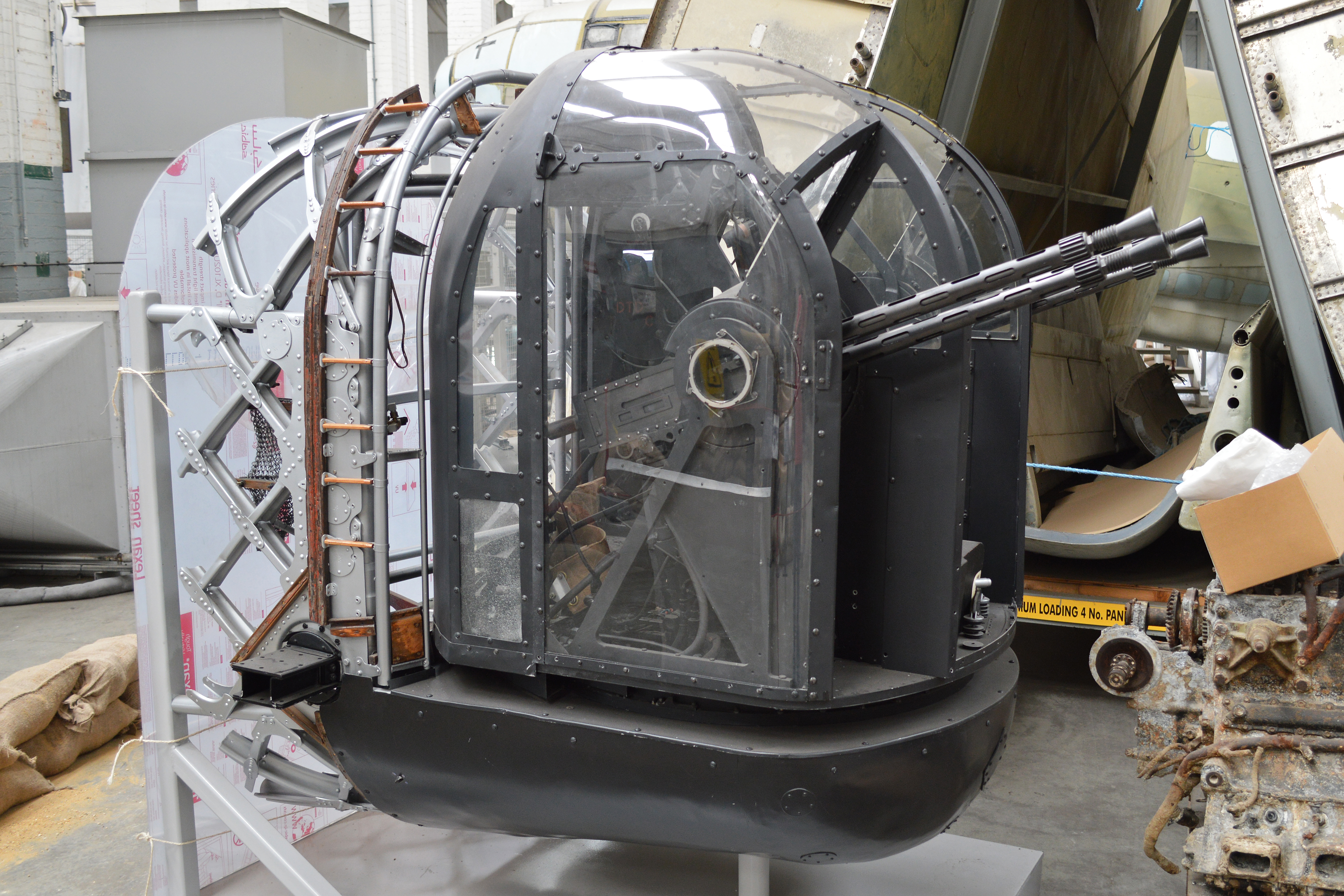
FN-20 tail turret

He was responsible for "many highly successful commercial inventions" starting with his Vickers-Nash Indicator. A friend, Gordon Burt of Mowlem, was having trouble with jib cranes and Nash came up with a device to calculate and display the weight of a load a crane was about to lift.

In 1929, he launched Nash Safe-Load Indicators, manufacture was later licensed to Vickers. Encouraged by this success and the promise of a better income than provided by AFN Limited he started a separate engineering company, Nash & Thompson, described as Air Ministry contractors and armament engineers with a special interest in its application to aircraft.

==== FN servo-operated gunner's installation ====
In 1935, Nash & Thompson was sold into a new grouping, Parnall Aircraft Limited, formed with Parnall's shopfitters turned wartime fuselage and vessel manufacturers and Hendy Aircraft Company. In the documentation of the amalgamation, special provision was made for the Frazer-Nash (sic) Servo-operated Gunner's Installation which had completed extensive trials with the RAF. Manufacturing rights to his Frazer Nash Safety Wing-tip Flare Apparatus had been sold to S Smith & Sons and "the Governments of USA, Italy and other foreign countries". Nash remained on the board of directors as technical director. H R Godfrey left to form his HRG Engineering Company with Halford and Robins.

== Later years ==
After the Second World War, Nash again started inventing engineered products for defence, aircraft and atomic energy fields. After his death in 1965, the business continued growing as Frazer Nash Group until forced into receivership in 1990 by the UK government defence expenditure cuts.

Divisions that survived the demise of the Frazer Nash Group included Frazer-Nash Consultancy, Frazer-Nash Manufacturing and Frazer-Nash Research. The latter is now a division of Kamkorp, which purchased Bristol Cars in 2011.
