= GN (car) =

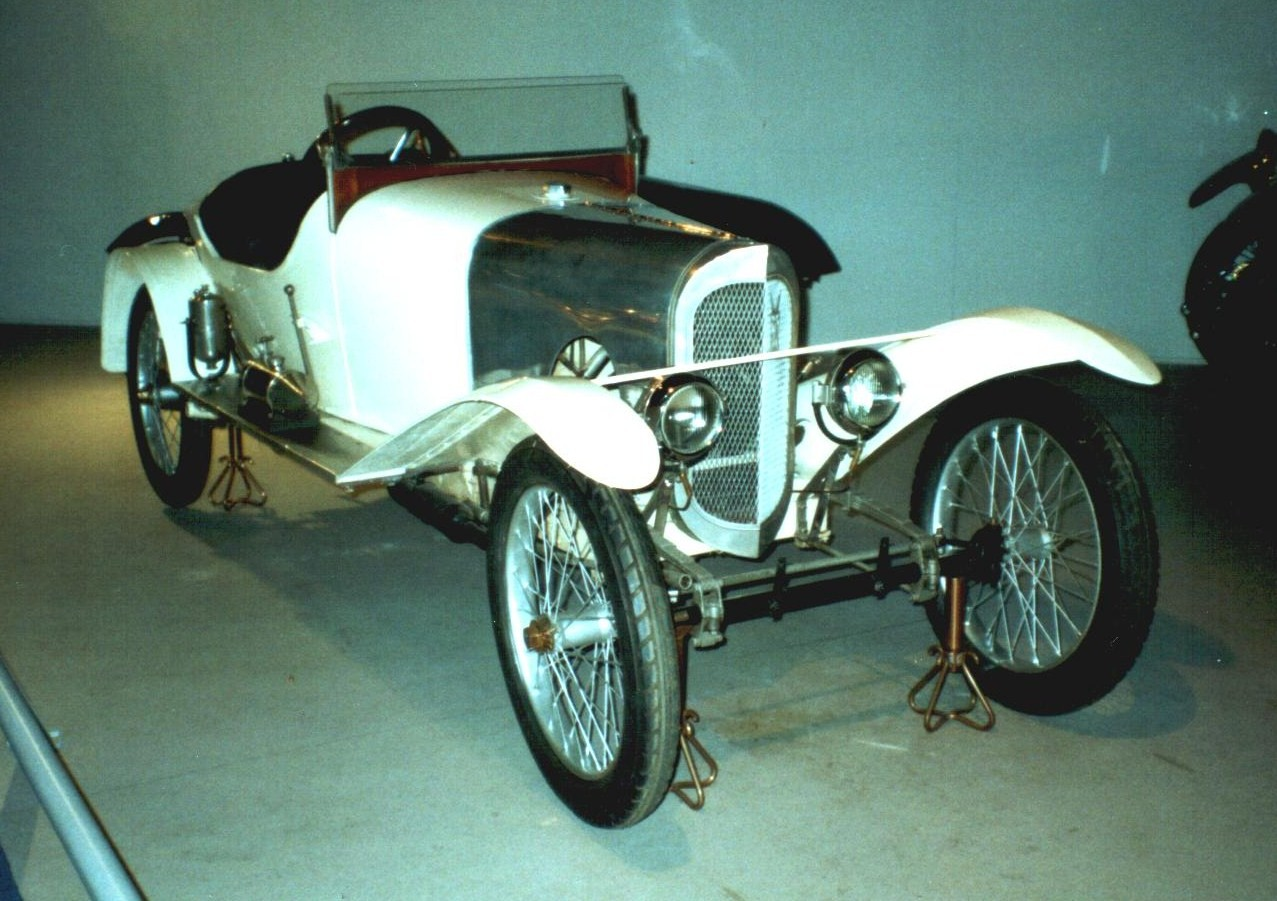
1921 GN

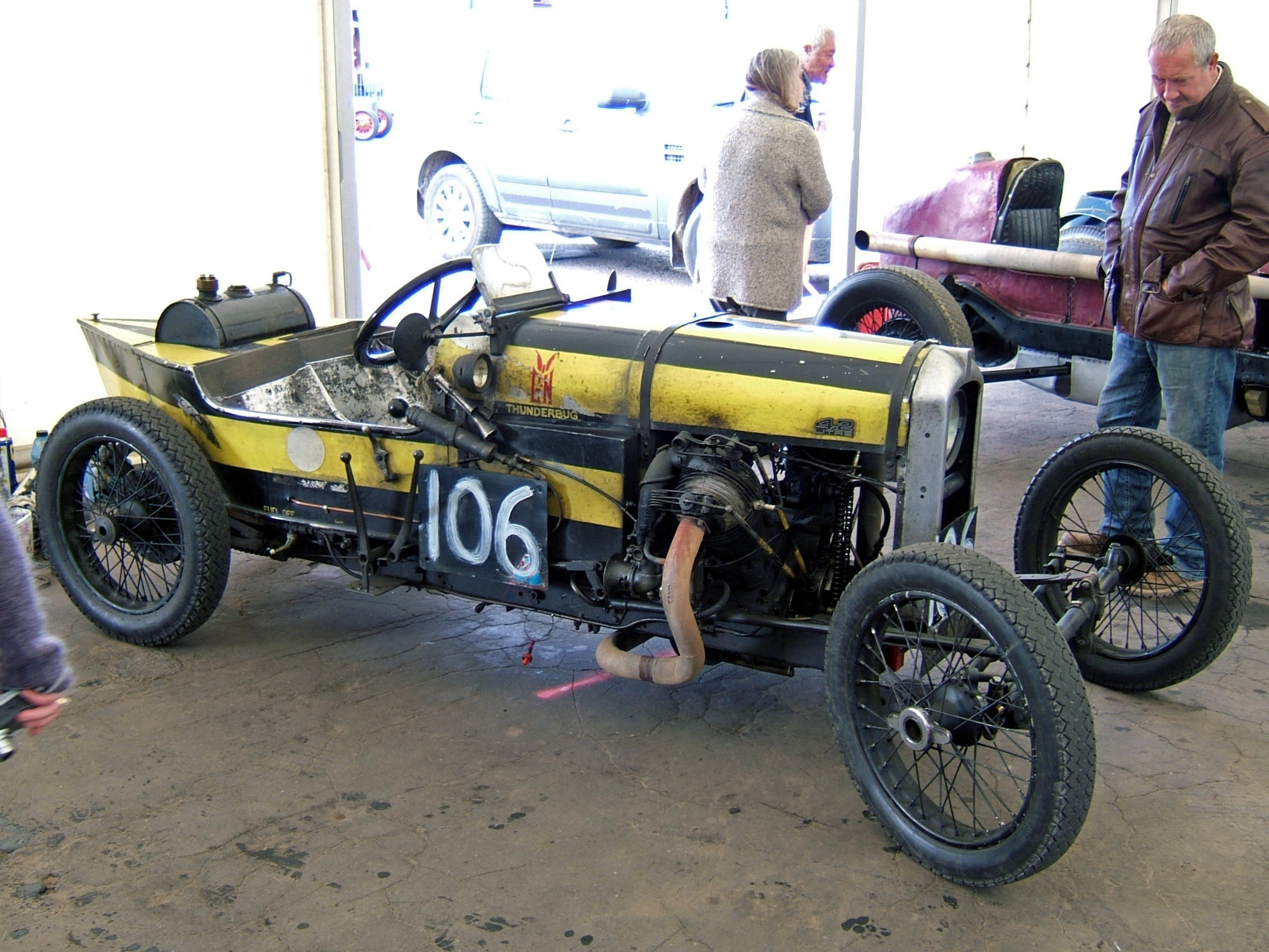
The GN Thunderbug special, with a 4.3 litre V-twin engine.

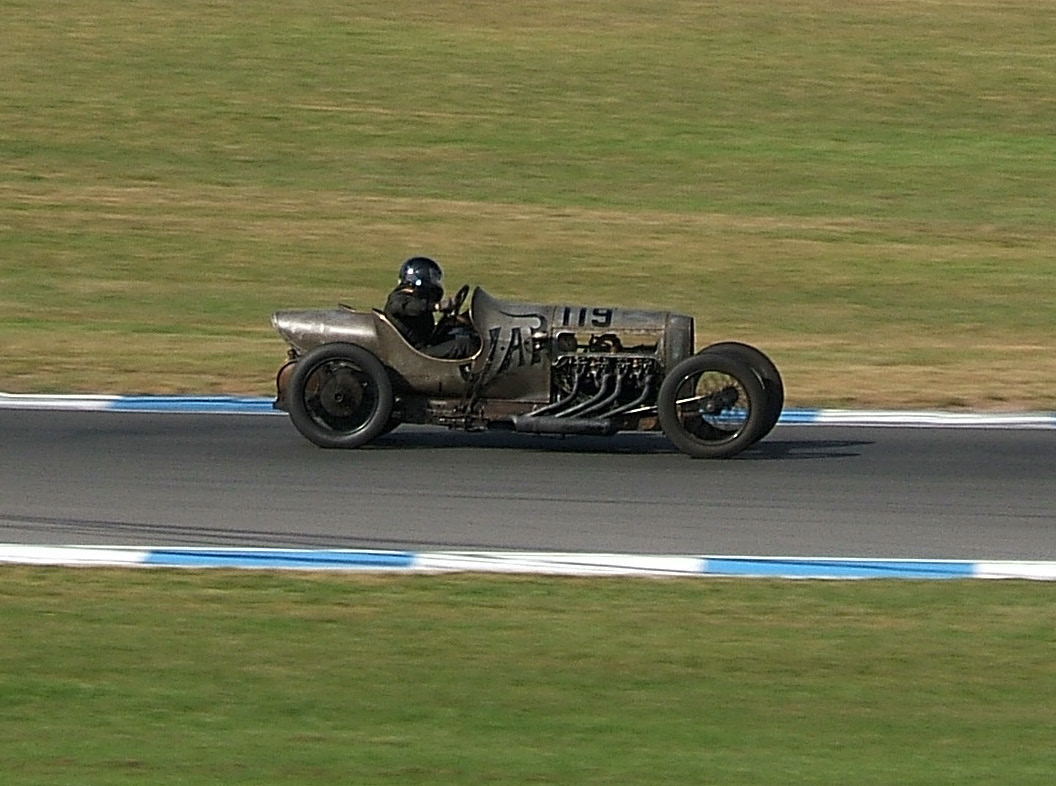
JAP-engined GN Grand Prix special at the VSCC SeeRed race meeting, Donington Park, September 2007. It has a 5.1 litre V8 aircraft engine in a lightweight cyclecar frame.

The GN was a British cyclecar, made in Middlesex between 1910 and 1925. The name derived from its founders, H.R. Godfrey and Archibald Frazer-Nash. Production ceased in 1923 but the company kept trading until 1925.

== History ==
GN cyclecars were made from 1910 until 1923. Their original factory was in Hendon, Middlesex, but the company later moved to Wandsworth, London. The name derives from its founders, H.R. Godfrey (1887–1968) and Archibald Frazer-Nash (1889–1965). Production ceased in 1923, but the company continued trading until 1925.

After making several cars for their own use, the two founders launched the GN car in 1909, building them in the stables at the Frazer-Nash family home. The car was powered by a V twin engine by JAP or Peugeot with belt drive to the rear wheels. By 1911, production had moved to Hendon and GN's own 1,100 cc engine, which included some Peugeot parts. The engine was mounted in the chassis with the crankshaft parallel to the front axle, driving through a two-speed transmission by chain and dog clutch, then by belt to the rear wheels. The two-seat car was very light, weighing only about 180 kg (397 lb). Therefore, in spite of the low power available, 60 mph (97 km/h) was achievable, which was very respectable performance for the time.

The engine was turned 90 degrees in 1913, with its cylinder heads protruding through the bonnet sides, and a team was entered into the French Cyclecar Grand Prix, resulting in sports models being added to the range. Some 200 cars had been made when production stopped with the outbreak of World War I.

Production restarted in 1919, and shortly afterward the company was bought by British Grégoire Ltd and moved to East Hill, Wandsworth in southwest London. The chassis changed from wood to steel, with the chain type transmission now with three speeds and reverse. At its peak, 500 staff were employed, making 55 cars a month. A licence to make the cars was agreed upon with the French maker Salmson who made about 1,600 cars.

By 1921, the cyclecar boom was on the wane and the company went into receivership but was soon sold. The new owner, a Mr Black, wanted to move to much higher production levels and away from sports cars. A model with a four-cylinder, water-cooled, 1,098 cc DFP engine and shaft drive to a differential on the solid rear axle was introduced in 1922 as part of the new policy. Godfrey and Frazer-Nash left the company later that year. In 1923 a Chapuis-Dornier engine replaced the DFP, but production of the new car and the old V twin model stopped in May. About 4,000 cars of all types were made by GN in the post war period.

A new company was founded by some ex-employees and a few more cars were made from parts in 1924 and 1925, but the main business was spares and service. In 1925 the company became General Motors dealers.

H.R. Godfrey went on to found a new car company, Godfrey-Proctor, and later HRG. Frazer Nash formed the car maker that took his name, where he re-introduced his chain and clutch transmission system.

== Famous GNs ==
The most notable racing GNs were Archie Fraser-Nash's "Mowgli", "Kim" and Basil Davenport's "Spider", "BHD" and his "Big Spider".

Other famous prewar "GN Specials" were "Wasp", "Wilkes-GN", "GNat", "Martyr", "The Becke Powerplus", "The Wilkes GN" "The Chawner GN", "Grasshopper" & "COGNAC", all of them very successful hill climb cars of the 1920s and 1930s. Many still compete today, alongside a number of machines recently constructed from period parts.

Spider was an extremely successful sprint car and held the outright record at Shelsley Walsh Speed Hill Climb several times in the 1920s.

== Poetry ==
A doggerel rhyme of the time went:

Nash and Godfrey hated cogs,
Built a car with chains and dogs.
And it worked, but would it if
They had built it with a diff

== Bibliography ==
- Baldwin, Nick (1991). A-Z of Cars of the 1920s. London: Motorbooks International. ISBN 978-1870979535.
- Georgano, GN, ed. (2000). Beaulieu Encyclopedia of the Automobile. London: Routledge. ISBN 978-1579582937.
