= 2021 British Hillclimb Championship =

British Hillclimb Championship

The 2021 British Hillclimb Championship presented by Avon Tyres is the 74th running of the series, which began in 1947. In normal circumstances it would have been the 75th, but the 2020 season was cancelled due to the global COVID-19 pandemic.

The 2021 Championship was won by 2019 (and reigning) title holder Wallace Menzies, driving a Gould GR59M with a 3.3-litre V8 engine derived from the Cosworth XD.

== Format ==
According to the Championship regulations, points are awarded according to a driver's positions in each of two Run-Offs held at every event. The Run-Offs are contested by the registered drivers who achieve the twelve best times in the preliminary class runs. The scoring system is as follows:

Points
1st	2nd	3rd	4th	5th	6th	7th	8th	9th	10th	11th	12th
10	9	8	7	6	5	4	3	2	1	0	0

In addition, an extra point is awarded to any driver whose time is under the outright course record at the start of the event. To clarify, the extra point is awarded if that record is beaten in the second Run-Off even if a new record has been set in the first Run-Off, or in any of the class runs. Assuming the planned 28 rounds are held, a driver's best 22 scores will count towards their total, though this number will be reduced if any rounds are cancelled.

The cancellation of Round 16 at Harewood due to adverse weather conditions reduced the number of rounds to 27 and the number of counting scores to 21 (see Round 15 below).

The Championship is open to drivers of many types of car, including completely unmodified production road vehicles. In practice, however, it is overwhelmingly likely that the Champion will drive a single-seat race car either designed and built specially for hillclimbing or converted from a design suitable for circuit racing.

== Name ==
The terms 'hillclimb' and 'hill climb' are used interchangeably. 'Hillclimb' is used on this page because it is the form chosen by the Championship organisers, who also refer to the BHC (British Hillclimb Championship) rather than BHCC (British Hill Climb Championship).

== Calendar changes ==
The Championship was originally scheduled to start at Prescott on April 24/25. The meeting went ahead as planned, but not as a Championship round, "following concerns over some competitors likely to experience travel difficulties due to COVID restrictions within their home countries". The Championship therefore started three weeks later than intended, at Loton Park on May 15/16. The rounds at Craigantlet, originally to be held on May 1, were postponed to September 11, "to avoid any uncertainty surrounding potential travel restrictions due to the current pandemic".

On February 19, the Championship organisers announced that the rounds due to be held in July at the Channel Islands venues, Bouley Bay and Val des Terres, had been abandoned completely after consultation with the organising clubs, "due to the uncertainties regarding travel restrictions throughout the summer".

== Event results ==
=== Round 1, Loton Park, May 16 ===
Organiser: Hagley & District Light Car Club

Track/weather conditions: mixed

Official results
Position	Driver	Car	Time
1	Wallace Menzies	3.3 Gould GR59M-Cosworth XD	44.11 seconds
2	Alex Summers	2.65 DJ Firestorm-Cosworth XD	44.45 seconds
3	Scott Moran	4.0 Gould GR59-Judd	45.17 seconds
4	Will Hall	2.0 turbocharged Force WH-XTEC	45.41 seconds
5	Trevor Willis	3.2 OMS 28-RPE	45.62 seconds
6	David Uren	3.5 Gould GR55-Cosworth	45.95 seconds
7	Eynon Price	1.6 Force TA-Suzuki	46.57 seconds
8	Graham Wynn	4.0 Gould GR59-Judd	48.75 seconds
9	Andrew Coley	2.5 Gould GR55-Opel Cosworth	49.81 seconds
10	Adam Greenen	1.1 Empire Evo 2-Suzuki	49.83 seconds
11	Steve Owen	2.7 OMS 28-RPE	50.25 seconds
12	Matthew Ryder	1.6 Empire Wraith-Suzuki	Did not finish

Sean Gould, considered a Championship contender, did not qualify for this Run-Off due to failing to complete his class run.

Wallace Menzies scored his 39th BHC Run-Off win in this round.

This event was livestreamed on YouTube. Footage of the first Run-Off starts at 4:09:00.

=== Round 2, Loton Park, May 16 ===
Organiser: Hagley & District Light Car Club

Track/weather conditions: mixed

Official results
Position	Driver	Car	Time
1	Wallace Menzies	3.3 Gould GR59M-Cosworth XD	43.55 seconds
2	Sean Gould	4.0 Gould GR59JB-Judd	44.27 seconds
3	Alex Summers	2.65 DJ Firestorm-Cosworth XD	44.32 seconds
4	Will Hall	2.0 turbocharged Force WH-XTEC	44.54 seconds
5	Scott Moran	4.0 Gould GR59-Judd	45.09 seconds
6	Trevor Willis	3.2 OMS 28-RPE	45.49 seconds
7	David Uren	3.5 Gould GR55-Cosworth	45.64 seconds
8	Eynon Price	1.6 Force TA-Suzuki	47.13 seconds
9	Ben Stephenson	1.3 supercharged Empire Evo 2-Suzuki	48.58 seconds
10	Andrew Coley	2.5 Gould GR55-Opel Cosworth	49.22 seconds
11	Adam Greenen	1.1 Empire Evo 2-Suzuki	49.60 seconds
12	Paul Haimes	1.3 turbocharged Gould GR59-Suzuki	Did not start

Wallace Menzies scored his 40th BHC Run-Off win in this round.

This event was livestreamed on YouTube. Footage of the second Run-Off starts at 8:48:35.

=== Round 3, Gurston Down, May 29 ===
Organiser: BARC South West Centre

Track/weather conditions: warm and dry

Official results
Position	Driver	Car	Time
1	Wallace Menzies	3.3 Gould GR59M-Cosworth XD	25.55 seconds
2	Alex Summers	2.65 DJ Firestorm-Cosworth XD	25.88 seconds
3	Will Hall	2.0 turbocharged Force WH-XTEC	25.97 seconds
4	Sean Gould	4.0 Gould GR59JB-Judd	26.05 seconds
5	Trevor Willis	3.2 OMS 28-RPE	26.60 seconds
6	Scott Moran	4.0 Gould GR59-Judd	26.67 seconds
7	Paul Haimes	1.3 turbocharged Gould GR59-Suzuki	27.37 seconds
8	Graham Wynn	4.0 Gould GR59-Judd	28.13 seconds
9	David Warburton	1.6 Gould GR59-Suzuki	28.26 seconds
10	Eynon Price	1.6 Force TA-Suzuki	28.66 seconds
11	Andy Greenen	1.1 Empire Evo 2-Suzuki	29.15 seconds
12	Simon Moyse	1.3 supercharged Gould GR59-Suzuki	39.87 seconds

Wallace Menzies scored his 41st BHC Run-Off win in this round.

Trevor Willis set a new Championship record by qualifying for his 549th Run-Off in this round.

This event was livestreamed on YouTube. Footage of the first Run-Off starts at 2:07:00.

=== Round 4, Gurston Down, May 29 ===
Organiser: BARC South West Centre

Track/weather conditions: dry, becoming cloudy

Official results
Position	Driver	Car	Time
1	Will Hall	2.0 turbocharged Force WH-XTEC	26.00 seconds
2	Alex Summers	2.65 DJ Firestorm-Cosworth XD	26.02 seconds
3	Wallace Menzies	3.3 Gould GR59M-Cosworth XD	26.20 seconds
4	Scott Moran	4.0 Gould GR59-Judd	26.48 seconds
5	Sean Gould	4.0 Gould GR59JB-Judd	26.58 seconds
6	Trevor Willis	3.2 OMS 28-RPE	26.79 seconds
7	Paul Haimes	1.3 turbocharged Gould GR59-Suzuki	27.65 seconds
8	Graham Wynn	4.0 Gould GR59-Judd	27.87 seconds
9	Eynon Price	1.6 Force TA-Suzuki	28.73 seconds
10	David Warburton	1.6 Gould GR59-Suzuki	28.92 seconds
11	Andy Greenen	1.1 Empire Evo 2-Suzuki	29.01 seconds
12	Steve Owen	2.7 OMS 28-RPE	29.27 seconds

Will Hall scored his 25th BHC Run-Off win in this round.

This event was livestreamed on YouTube. Footage of the second Run-Off starts at 4:20:00.

=== Round 5, Gurston Down, May 30 ===
Organiser: BARC South West Centre

Track/weather conditions: warm and dry

Official results
Position	Driver	Car	Time
1	Wallace Menzies	3.3 Gould GR59M-Cosworth XD	25.34 seconds R
2	Alex Summers	2.65 DJ Firestorm-Cosworth XD	25.44 seconds
3	Sean Gould	4.0 Gould GR59JB-Judd	25.54 seconds
4	Will Hall	2.0 turbocharged Force WH-XTEC	26.18 seconds
5	Scott Moran	4.0 Gould GR59-Judd	26.28 seconds
6	Trevor Willis	3.2 OMS 28-RPE	26.34 seconds
7	Simon Moyse	1.3 supercharged Gould GR59-Suzuki	28.07 seconds
8	Graham Wynn	4.0 Gould GR59-Judd	28.09 seconds
9	Eynon Price	1.6 Force TA-Suzuki	28.40 seconds
10	Steve Owen	2.7 OMS 28-RPE	28.42 seconds
11	David Warburton	1.6 Gould GR59-Suzuki	28.49 seconds
12	Paul Haimes	1.3 turbocharged Gould GR59-Suzuki	Did not start

- R = new outright course record

Wallace Menzies scored his 42nd BHC Run-Off win in this round.

This event was livestreamed on YouTube. Footage of the first Run-Off starts at 1:46:00. An interview with Wallace Menzies, celebrating his new course record, starts at 2:42:15.

=== Round 6, Gurston Down, May 30 ===
Organiser: BARC South West Centre

Track/weather conditions: warm and dry

Official results
Position	Driver	Car	Time
1	Wallace Menzies	3.3 Gould GR59M-Cosworth XD	25.61 seconds
2	Sean Gould	4.0 Gould GR59JB-Judd	25.67 seconds
3	Alex Summers	2.65 DJ Firestorm-Cosworth XD	25.82 seconds
4	Trevor Willis	3.2 OMS 28-RPE	26.42 seconds
5	Simon Moyse	1.3 supercharged Gould GR59-Suzuki	28.08 seconds
6	David Warburton	1.6 Gould GR59-Suzuki	28.13 seconds
7	Eynon Price	1.6 Force TA-Suzuki	28.41 seconds
8	Allan Warburton	1.6 Gould GR59-Suzuki	29.18 seconds
9	Lee Griffiths	1.7 OMS 28-Suzuki	29.30 seconds
	Adam Greenen	1.1 Empire Evo 2-Suzuki	Did not finish
	Will Hall	2.0 turbocharged Force WH-XTEC	Did not finish
	Graham Wynn	4.0 Gould GR59-Judd	Did not start

Wallace Menzies scored his 43rd BHC Run-Off win in this round.

Will Hall left the course near the top of the hill, causing a long delay while the car was recovered.

Adam Greenen's Empire Evo 2 coasted to a halt during its run.

Scott Moran, who is sharing Graham Wynn's Gould GR59 this season, was unable to start the car's engine immediately before the second class run. This could not be fixed during the meeting, so Moran was unable to qualify for the second Run-Off. Wynn did qualify, but was unable to take part due to the starting issue.

Simon Moyse achieved his best BHC Run-Off result to date in this round.

This event was livestreamed on YouTube. Scott Moran's starting problem is shown at 3:17:00. Footage of the second Run-Off starts at 3:43:00. Adam Greenen's retirement can be seen at 3:48:00. The livestream was temporarily halted to avoid showing Will Hall's accident, but messages explaining that he was OK were displayed.

=== Round 7, Shelsley Walsh, June 6 ===
Organiser: Midland Automobile Club

Track/weather conditions: cloudy, drying

Official results
Position	Driver	Car	Time
1	Alex Summers	2.65 DJ Firestorm-Cosworth XD	24.07 seconds
2	Sean Gould	4.0 Gould GR59JB-Judd	24.51 seconds
3	Wallace Menzies	3.3 Gould GR59M-Cosworth XD	24.57 seconds
4	Scott Moran	4.0 Gould GR59-Judd	24.74 seconds
5	Trevor Willis	3.2 OMS 28-RPE	24.93 seconds
6	David Uren	3.5 Gould GR55-Cosworth	25.09 seconds
7	Paul Haimes	1.3 turbocharged Gould GR59-Suzuki	25.56 seconds
8	David Warburton	1.6 Gould GR59-Suzuki	25.91 seconds
9	Eynon Price	1.6 Force TA-Suzuki	26.77 seconds
10	Graham Wynn	4.0 Gould GR59-Judd	26.90 seconds
11	Adam Greenen	1.1 Empire Evo 2-Suzuki	26.91 seconds
12	Matthew Ryder	1.6 Empire Wraith-Suzuki	27.15 seconds

Alex Summers scored his 16th BHC Run-Off win in this round.

This event was livestreamed on YouTube. Footage of the first Run-Off starts at 2:56:00.

=== Round 8, Shelsley Walsh, June 6 ===
Organiser: Midland Automobile Club

Track/weather conditions: cloudy, dry

Official results
Position	Driver	Car	Time
1	Alex Summers	2.65 DJ Firestorm-Cosworth XD	23.15 seconds
2	Wallace Menzies	3.3 Gould GR59M-Cosworth XD	23.17 seconds
3	Sean Gould	4.0 Gould GR59JB-Judd	23.22 seconds
3	Scott Moran	4.0 Gould GR59-Judd	23.36 seconds
4	Trevor Willis	3.2 OMS 28-RPE	23.75 seconds
6	David Uren	3.5 Gould GR55-Cosworth	23.76 seconds
7	Paul Haimes	1.3 turbocharged Gould GR59-Suzuki	24.76 seconds
8	David Warburton	1.6 Gould GR59-Suzuki	25.09 seconds
9	Adam Greenen	1.1 Empire Evo 2-Suzuki	25.35 seconds
10	Graham Wynn	4.0 Gould GR59-Judd	25.41 seconds
11	Eynon Price	1.6 Force TA-Suzuki	26.91 seconds
12	Andy Greenen	1.1 Empire Evo 2-Suzuki	25.86 seconds

Alex Summers scored his 17th BHC Run-Off win in this round.

This event was livestreamed on YouTube. Footage of the second Run-Off starts at 8:03:00.

=== Round 9, Doune, June 19 ===
Organiser: Lothian Car Club

Track/weather conditions: warm, dry

Official results
Position	Driver	Car	Time
1	Alex Summers	2.65 DJ Firestorm-Cosworth XD	35.12 seconds
2	Wallace Menzies	3.3 Gould GR59M-Cosworth XD	35.92 seconds
3	Scott Moran	4.0 Gould GR59-Judd	37.04 seconds
4	Trevor Willis	3.2 OMS 28-RPE	37.17 seconds
5	Stuart Sugden	1.6 GWR Raptor-Suzuki	38.92 seconds
6	Johnathen Varley	2.0 GWR Predator-TKD V8	39.15 seconds
7	Paul Haimes	1.3 turbocharged Gould GR59-Suzuki	39.21 seconds
8	Harry Pick	1.1 OMS 3000M-Suzuki	39.53 seconds
9	Leslie Mutch	1.6 GWR Raptor-Suzuki	39.62 seconds
10	Andy Greenen	1.1 Empire Evo 2-Suzuki	39.96 seconds
11	Olivia Cooper	1.6 Force TA-Suzuki	40.58 seconds
12	Eynon Price	1.6 Force TA-Suzuki	41.22 seconds

Alex Summers scored his 18th BHC Run-Off win in this round.

Stuart Sugden qualified for a BHC Run-Off for the first time in this round.

This event was not livestreamed.

=== Round 10, Doune, June 19 ===
Organiser: Lothian Car Club

Track/weather conditions: warm, dry

Official results
Position	Driver	Car	Time
1	Sean Gould	4.0 Gould GR59JB-Judd	35.19 seconds
2	Wallace Menzies	3.3 Gould GR59M-Cosworth XD	35.62 seconds
3	Alex Summers	2.65 DJ Firestorm-Cosworth XD	35.66 seconds
4	Scott Moran	4.0 Gould GR59-Judd	36.91 seconds
5	David Uren	3.5 Gould GR55-Cosworth	38.22 seconds
6	Paul Haimes	1.3 turbocharged Gould GR59-Suzuki	38.41 seconds
7	Stuart Sugden	1.6 GWR Raptor-Suzuki	38.98 seconds
8	Trevor Willis	3.2 OMS 28-RPE	39.90 seconds
9	Andy Greenen	1.1 Empire Evo 2-Suzuki	39.98 seconds
10	Harry Pick	1.1 OMS 3000M-Suzuki	40.07 seconds
11	Johnathen Varley	2.0 GWR Predator-TKD V8	40.19 seconds
12	Olivia Cooper	1.6 Force TA-Suzuki	40.22 seconds

Sean Gould scored his 10th BHC Run-Off win in this round.

This event was not livestreamed.

=== Round 11, Doune, June 20 ===
Organiser: Lothian Car Club

Track/weather conditions: cloudy, dry

Official results
Position	Driver	Car	Time
1	Wallace Menzies	3.3 Gould GR59M-Cosworth XD	34.73 seconds R
2	Alex Summers	2.65 DJ Firestorm-Cosworth XD	34.74 seconds R
3	Sean Gould	4.0 Gould GR59JB-Judd	35.00 seconds
4	Scott Moran	4.0 Gould GR59-Judd	36.12 seconds
5	Trevor Willis	3.2 OMS 28-RPE	36.70 seconds
6	David Uren	3.5 Gould GR55-Cosworth	37.03 seconds
7	Johnathen Varley	2.0 GWR Predator-TKD V8	37.81 seconds
8	Stuart Sugden	1.6 GWR Raptor-Suzuki	37.87 seconds
9	Paul Haimes	1.3 turbocharged Gould GR59-Suzuki	38.33 seconds
10	Eynon Price	1.6 Force TA-Suzuki	39.31 seconds
11	Olivia Cooper	1.6 Force TA-Suzuki	39.44 seconds
12	Leslie Mutch	1.6 GWR Raptor-Suzuki	55.90 seconds

Wallace Menzies scored his 44th BHC Run-Off win in this round.

Alex Summers broke the existing course record of 34.76 seconds set on 22 June 2014 by Scott Moran. Wallace Menzies lowered it further a few minutes later. Both drivers scored an extra BHC point for being under the record as it stood at the start of the meeting.

This event was not livestreamed.

=== Round 12, Doune, June 20 ===
Organiser: Lothian Car Club

Track/weather conditions: cloudy, dry

Official results
Position	Driver	Car	Time
1	Sean Gould	4.0 Gould GR59JB-Judd	34.67 seconds R
2	Alex Summers	2.65 DJ Firestorm-Cosworth XD	34.76 seconds
3	Wallace Menzies	3.3 Gould GR59M-Cosworth XD	35.24 seconds
4	Scott Moran	4.0 Gould GR59-Judd	35.82 seconds
5	Trevor Willis	3.2 OMS 28-RPE	36.17 seconds
6	David Uren	3.5 Gould GR55-Cosworth	36.70 seconds
7	Paul Haimes	1.3 turbocharged Gould GR59-Suzuki	37.37 seconds
8	Stuart Sugden	1.6 GWR Raptor-Suzuki	37.87 seconds
9	Paul Haimes	1.3 turbocharged Gould GR59-Suzuki	38.29 seconds
10	Eynon Price	1.6 Force TA-Suzuki	38.93 seconds
11	Leslie Mutch	1.6 GWR Raptor-Suzuki	39.64 seconds
12	Olivia Cooper	1.6 Force TA-Suzuki	Did not start

Sean Gould scored his 11th BHC Run-Off win in this round.

Sean Gould broke the existing course record of 34.73 seconds set earlier in the day by Wallace Menzies, and scored an extra BHC point for being under Scott Moran's record which stood at the start of the meeting. All three of the drivers who won rounds at Doune over the weekend (Gould, Menzies and Summers) therefore held the record at some stage.

Alex Summers equalled Moran's record, but did not score an extra BHC point for doing so.

This event was not livestreamed.

=== Round 13, Barbon, July 3 ===
Organiser: Liverpool Motor Club

Track/weather conditions: dry

Official results
Position	Driver	Car	Time
1	Wallace Menzies	3.3 Gould GR59M-Cosworth XD	20.72 seconds
2	Alex Summers	2.65 DJ Firestorm-Cosworth XD	20.86 seconds
3	Trevor Willis	3.2 OMS 28-RPE	21.21 seconds
4	Sean Gould	4.0 Gould GR59JB-Judd	21.45 seconds
5	Scott Moran	4.0 Gould GR59-Judd	22.01 seconds
6	Eynon Price	1.6 Force TA-Suzuki	22.17 seconds
7	David Uren	3.5 Gould GR55-Cosworth	22.28 seconds
8	Paul Haimes	1.3 turbocharged Gould GR59-Suzuki	22.93 seconds
9	David Warburton	1.6 Gould GR59-Suzuki	23.24 seconds
10	Lee Griffiths	1.7 OMS 28-Suzuki	23.25 seconds
11	Olivia Cooper	1.6 Force TA-Suzuki	23.56 seconds
12	Harry Pick	1.1 OMS 3000M-Suzuki	Did not finish

Wallace Menzies scored his 45th BHC Run-Off win in this round.

This event was not livestreamed.

=== Round 14, Barbon, July 3 ===
Organiser: Liverpool Motor Club

Track/weather conditions: dry

Official results
Position	Driver	Car	Time
1	Alex Summers	2.65 DJ Firestorm-Cosworth XD	20.26 seconds
2	Wallace Menzies	3.3 Gould GR59M-Cosworth XD	20.49 seconds
3	Sean Gould	4.0 Gould GR59JB-Judd	20.66 seconds
4	Trevor Willis	3.2 OMS 28-RPE	21.07 seconds
5	David Uren	3.5 Gould GR55-Cosworth	21.18 seconds
6	Scott Moran	4.0 Gould GR59-Judd	21.53 seconds
7	David Warburton	1.6 Gould GR59-Suzuki	21.72 seconds
8	Lee Griffiths	1.7 OMS 28-Suzuki	22.34 seconds
9	Olivia Cooper	1.6 Force TA-Suzuki	22.64 seconds
10	Simon Moyse	1.3 supercharged Gould GR59-Suzuki	22.68 seconds
11	Matthew Ryder	1.6 Empire Wraith-Suzuki	22.82 seconds
12	Nicola Menzies	3.5 Gould GR55-Cosworth	23.54 seconds

Alex Summers scored his 19th BHC Run-Off win in this round.

This event was not livestreamed.

=== Round 15, Harewood, July 4 ===
Organiser: British Automobile Racing Club North West Centre

Track/weather conditions: drying

Official results
Position	Driver	Car	Time
1	Wallace Menzies	3.3 Gould GR59M-Cosworth XD	47.99 seconds
2	Alex Summers	2.65 DJ Firestorm-Cosworth XD	50.49 seconds
3	Richard Spedding	1.3 supercharged GWR Raptor 2-Suzuki	51.21 seconds
4	Scott Moran	4.0 Gould GR59-Judd	51.28 seconds
5	Eynon Price	1.6 Force TA-Suzuki	52.86 seconds
6	Andy Greenen	1.1 Empire Evo 2-Suzuki	53.15 seconds
7	Allan Warburton	1.6 Gould GR59-Suzuki	53.21 seconds
8	Harry Pick	1.7 OMS 28-Suzuki	53.64 seconds
9	David Warburton	1.6 Gould GR59-Suzuki	53.76 seconds
10	Liam Cooper	1.6 Force TA-Suzuki	55.42 seconds
11	Damien Bradley	2.35 turbocharged Subaru Legacy	61.03 seconds
12	Jack Cottrill	2.65 Dallara-Cosworth XD	74.87 seconds

Wallace Menzies scored his 46th BHC Run-Off win in this round.

A shower of rain during the class runs created several anomalies in the list of qualifiers for the Run-Off. Notably, Andy Greenen, whose class run took place while the track was still dry, was the fastest qualifier in his 1100cc Suzuki Hayabusa-engined Empire Evo 2, a car with too little power to be considered a front-runner in normal circumstances. Damien Bradley qualified in his Subaru Legacy, becoming the first driver to do so in a road-based car in the 2021 season. Greenen went on to achieve his best BHC Run-Off result to date in this round.

The track conditions were better when the Run-Off started, and continued to improve. Menzies, running eighth out of 12, came within 0.18 seconds of the outright course record, which he had set on 7 July 2019. His winning margin of 2.5 seconds over Alex Summers was extraordinary in an era when Run-Offs may be decided by as little as 0.01 seconds (see Round 11 above), but it was much less than the 6.83-second margin of victory achieved by Tony Marsh at Prescott in 1961.

Jack Cottrill qualified for his first Run-Off of the season and was fifth fastest to the final timing split point but spun coming out of the final corner. There was no damage to car or driver, but Cottrill lost approximately 22 seconds and dropped to 12th position.

The rain returned shortly afterwards, and became so heavy that the organisers had to cancel the rest of the meeting due to the adverse conditions. The number of rounds was therefore reduced to 27, and the number of counting scores to 21 (see Format section above).

This event was livestreamed on YouTube. Footage of the Run-Off starts at 3:56:00. The latter part of Andy Greenen's qualifying run can be seen at 2:36:00. Jack Cottrill's run (and spin) can be seen from 4:03:38. Notice of the meeting's abandonment is shown at 5:30:28.

=== Round 16, Harewood, July 4 ===
Organiser: British Automobile Racing Club North West Centre

Event cancelled (see Round 15).

=== Round 17, Prescott, July 25 ===
Organiser: Bugatti Owners' Club

Track/weather conditions: warm, dry

Official results
Position	Driver	Car	Time
1	Wallace Menzies	3.3 Gould GR59M-Cosworth XD	35.46 seconds
2	Sean Gould	4.0 Gould GR59JB-Judd	35.56 seconds
3	Alex Summers	2.65 DJ Firestorm-Cosworth XD	36.18 seconds
4	Scott Moran	4.0 Gould GR59-Judd	36.50 seconds
5	Richard Spedding	1.3 supercharged GWR Raptor 2-Suzuki	37.20 seconds
6	Zachary Zammitt	1.6 Empire Wraith-Suzuki	37.50 seconds
7=	Eynon Price	1.6 Force TA-Suzuki	37.61 seconds
7=	David Warburton	1.6 Gould GR59-Suzuki	37.61 seconds
9	Johnathen Varley	2.0 GWR Predator-TKD V8	38.13 seconds
10	Charles Hall	1.6 Empire Wraith-Suzuki	38.21 seconds
11	Adam Greenen	1.1 Empire Evo 2-Suzuki	38.22 seconds
12	Paul Haimes	1.3 turbocharged Gould GR59-Suzuki	40.69 seconds

Wallace Menzies scored his 47th BHC Run-Off win in this round.

Zachary Zammitt and Charles Hall, sharing the same car, both scored their first BHC points in this round.

Eynon Price and David Warburton became the first drivers to set the same time in a Run-Off during the 2021 season.

Paul Haimes was sixth fastest up to the entry of Pardon hairpin, but half-spun on his way into the corner, lost time and finished 12th.

This event was livestreamed on YouTube. Footage of the first Run-Off starts at 2:44:00. Paul Haimes's spin can be seen at 2:55:20.

=== Round 18, Prescott, July 25 ===
Organiser: Bugatti Owners' Club

Track/weather conditions: warm, dry

Official results
Position	Driver	Car	Time
1	Wallace Menzies	3.3 Gould GR59M-Cosworth XD	35.75 seconds
2	Alex Summers	2.65 DJ Firestorm-Cosworth XD	35.94 seconds
3	Sean Gould	4.0 Gould GR59JB-Judd	35.99 seconds
4	Richard Spedding	1.3 supercharged GWR Raptor 2-Suzuki	36.31 seconds
5	Scott Moran	4.0 Gould GR59-Judd	36.38 seconds
6	Paul Haimes	1.3 turbocharged Gould GR59-Suzuki	37.26 seconds
7	Zachary Zammitt	1.6 Empire Wraith-Suzuki	37.29 seconds
8	David Warburton	1.6 Gould GR59-Suzuki	37.38 seconds
9	Charles Hall	1.6 Empire Wraith-Suzuki	37.83 seconds
10	Johnathen Varley	2.0 GWR Predator-TKD V8	37.85 seconds
11	Eynon Price	1.6 Force TA-Suzuki	37.89 seconds
12	Lee Griffiths	1.7 OMS 28-Suzuki	38.47 seconds

Wallace Menzies scored his 48th BHC Run-Off win in this round.

This event was livestreamed on YouTube. Footage of the first Run-Off starts at 6:09:50. Interviews with leading drivers Sean Gould, Richard Spedding, Wallace Menzies and Alex Summers, and with classic Allard driver Chris Pring, begin at 3:37:50.

=== Round 19, Wiscombe Park, August 1 ===
Organiser: Woolbridge Motor Club

Track/weather conditions: drying at first after early rain, then heavy rain

Official results
Position	Driver	Car	Time
1	Wallace Menzies	3.3 Gould GR59M-Cosworth XD	34.78 seconds
2	Sean Gould	4.0 Gould GR59JB-Judd	35.44 seconds
3	Scott Moran	4.0 Gould GR59-Judd	36.18 seconds
4	Matthew Ryder	1.6 Empire Wraith-Suzuki	36.96 seconds
5	David Warburton	1.6 Gould GR59-Suzuki	37.93 seconds
6	Jason Tunnicliffe	1.6 Empire Evo 2-Suzuki	39.12 seconds
7	Graham Wynn	4.0 Gould GR59-Judd	39.88 seconds
8	Lee Griffiths	1.7 OMS 28-Suzuki	43.12 seconds
9	Paul Haimes	1.3 turbocharged Gould GR59-Suzuki	43.15 seconds
10	Eynon Price	1.6 Force TA-Suzuki	44.24 seconds
11	Darren Gumbley	1.6 Force TA-Suzuki	Did not finish
12	Richard Spedding	1.3 supercharged GWR Raptor 2-Suzuki	Did not finish

Wallace Menzies scored his 49th BHC Run-Off win in this round. Jason Tunnicliffe qualified for his first ever Run-Off. Matthew Ryder scored his first points of the 2021 season. Darren Gumbley qualified for his first Run-Off of the 2021 season.

The class runs took place on a damp track, which slightly favoured the less powerful cars registered for the BHC. Paul Haimes qualified fastest, while Championship contenders Alex Summers and Trevor Willis failed to qualify, for the first time in 2021 in Summers's case.

The situation was reversed during the Run-Off itself. At first, the track was drier than before. However, Richard Spedding crashed on his run, causing no injury to himself but significantly damaging his car. During the clear-up, it began to rain heavily. The lower-powered cars which had been among the fastest qualifiers (and therefore ran late in the Run-Off) therefore had to run on a wet track, and were slower than they would have been in better conditions.

This event was livestreamed on Facebook. Footage of the first Run-Off starts at 2:09:00. Richard Spedding's accident is shown at 2:25:50. Interviews with Trevor Willis, Wallace Menzies, Alex Summers, Graham Wynn, Olivia Cooper, Richard Spedding and Scott Moran (all recorded the previous day) begin at 3:04:20.

=== Round 20, Wiscombe Park, August 1 ===
Organiser: Woolbridge Motor Club

Track/weather conditions: damp

Official results
Position	Driver	Car	Time
1	Wallace Menzies	3.3 Gould GR59M-Cosworth XD	37.31 seconds
2	Sean Gould	4.0 Gould GR59JB-Judd	38.17 seconds
3	Paul Haimes	1.3 turbocharged Gould GR59-Suzuki	38.97 seconds
4	Scott Moran	4.0 Gould GR59-Judd	39.05 seconds
5	Eynon Price	1.6 Force TA-Suzuki	39.23 seconds
6	Alex Summers	2.65 DJ Firestorm-Cosworth XD	39.24 seconds
7	Trevor Willis	3.2 OMS 28-RPE	39.29 seconds
8	Lee Griffiths	1.7 OMS 28-Suzuki	40.40 seconds
9	Darren Gumbley	1.6 Force TA-Suzuki	40.91 seconds
10	Kelvin Broad	1.3 supercharged Force TA-Suzuki	40.95 seconds
11	Harry Pick	1.1 OMS 3000M-Suzuki	41.18 seconds
12	David Warburton	1.6 Gould GR59-Suzuki	41.33 seconds

Wallace Menzies scored his 50th BHC Run-Off win in this round. Kelvin Broad qualified for his first Run-Off of the 2021 season.

This event was livestreamed on Facebook. Footage of the second Run-Off starts at 5:57:00.

=== Round 21, Shelsley Walsh, August 15 ===
Organiser: Midland Automobile Club

Track/weather conditions: dry

Official results
Position	Driver	Car	Time
1	Sean Gould	4.0 Gould GR59JB-Judd	22.37 seconds R
2	Alex Summers	2.65 DJ Firestorm-Cosworth XD	22.52 seconds R
3	Wallace Menzies	3.3 Gould GR59M-Cosworth XD	22.55 seconds R
4	Scott Moran	4.0 Gould GR59-Judd	22.64 seconds
5	David Uren	3.5 Gould GR55-Cosworth	22.68 seconds
6	Trevor Willis	3.2 OMS 28-RPE	23.48 seconds
7	Paul Haimes	1.3 turbocharged Gould GR59-Suzuki	24.43 seconds
8	Zachary Zammitt	1.6 Empire Wraith-Suzuki	24.60 seconds
9	Jack Cottrill	2.65 DJ Dallara-Cosworth XD	24.71 seconds
10	David Warburton	1.6 Gould GR59-Suzuki	24.86 seconds
11	Graham Wynn	4.0 Gould GR59-Judd	25.39 seconds
12	Simon Moyse	1.3 supercharged Gould GR59-Suzuki	25.41 seconds

Sean Gould scored his 12th BHC Run-Off win in this round.

Gould, Alex Summers and Wallace Menzies were all under the long-standing outright course record of 22.58 seconds set by Martin Groves on 17 August 2008. Scott Moran and David Uren were both within a tenth of a second of the old record.

This event was not livestreamed.

=== Round 22, Shelsley Walsh, August 15 ===
Organiser: Midland Automobile Club

Track/weather conditions: dry

Official results
Position	Driver	Car	Time
1	Scott Moran	4.0 Gould GR59-Judd	22.68 seconds
2	Wallace Menzies	3.3 Gould GR59M-Cosworth XD	22.74 seconds
3	David Uren	3.5 Gould GR55-Cosworth	22.98 seconds
4	Sean Gould	4.0 Gould GR59JB-Judd	23.02 seconds
5	Alex Summers	2.65 DJ Firestorm-Cosworth XD	23.24 seconds
6	Trevor Willis	3.2 OMS 28-RPE	23.52 seconds
7	Paul Haimes	1.3 turbocharged Gould GR59-Suzuki	24.28 seconds
8	Graham Wynn	4.0 Gould GR59-Judd	24.48 seconds
9	Nicola Menzies	3.5 Gould GR55-Cosworth	24.60 seconds
10	Jack Cottrill	2.65 DJ Dallara-Cosworth XD	24.75 seconds
11	David Warburton	1.6 Gould GR59-Suzuki	24.99 seconds
12	Simon Moyse	1.3 supercharged Gould GR59-Suzuki	25.16 seconds

Scott Moran extended his record number of Run-Off wins to 162. Nicola Menzies scored her first BHC points of the 2021 season.

This event was not livestreamed.

=== Round 23, Prescott, September 5 ===
Organiser: Bugatti Owners' Club

Track/weather conditions: warm, dry

Official results
Position	Driver	Car	Time
1	Alex Summers	2.65 DJ Firestorm-Cosworth XD	35.50 seconds
2	Wallace Menzies	3.3 Gould GR59M-Cosworth XD	35.54 seconds
3	Scott Moran	4.0 Gould GR59-Judd	35.84 seconds
4	David Uren	3.5 Gould GR55-Cosworth	35.88 seconds
5	Trevor Willis	3.2 OMS 28-RPE	36.17 seconds
6	Sean Gould	4.0 Gould GR59JB-Judd	36.36 seconds
7	Richard Spedding	1.3 supercharged GWR Raptor 2-Suzuki	37.02 seconds
8	David Warburton	1.6 Gould GR59-Suzuki	37.07 seconds
9	Jack Cottrill	2.65 DJ Dallara-Cosworth XD	37.46 seconds
10	Darren Gumbley	1.6 Force TA-Suzuki	37.78 seconds
11	Simon Moyse	1.3 supercharged Gould GR59-Suzuki	37.86 seconds
12	Lee Griffiths	1.7 OMS 28-Suzuki	38.16 seconds

Alex Summers scored his 22nd BHC Run-Off win in this round.

This event was livestreamed on YouTube. Footage of the first Run-Off starts at 2:28:10.

=== Round 24, Prescott, September 5 ===
Organiser: Bugatti Owners' Club

Track/weather conditions: warm, dry

Official results
Position	Driver	Car	Time
1	Wallace Menzies	3.3 Gould GR59M-Cosworth XD	34.65 seconds R
2	Alex Summers	2.65 DJ Firestorm-Cosworth XD	35.40 seconds R
3	Scott Moran	4.0 Gould GR59-Judd	35.84 seconds
4	David Uren	3.5 Gould GR55-Cosworth	35.89 seconds
5	Sean Gould	4.0 Gould GR59JB-Judd	36.45 seconds
6	Will Hall	2.0 turbocharged Force WH-XTEC	36.66 seconds
7	Richard Spedding	1.3 supercharged GWR Raptor 2-Suzuki	36.96 seconds
9	Jack Cottrill	2.65 DJ Dallara-Cosworth XD	37.58 seconds
10	David Warburton	1.6 Gould GR59-Suzuki	37.60 seconds
11	Charles Hall	1.6 Empire Wraith-Suzuki	38.25 seconds
	Trevor Willis	3.2 OMS 28-RPE	Did not finish

Wallace Menzies scored his 51st BHC Run-Off win in this round.

Menzies set a new outright course record of 35.12 seconds on his second class runs, and lowered it further to 34.65 seconds in this Run-Off. Alex Summers did not hold the record at any stage, but he scored an extra BHC point for being under Sean Gould's record of 35.41 seconds, which stood at the start of the meeting.

Will Hall scored BHC points in his first event following the complete rebuild of his car, which had been very badly damaged in an accident earlier in the season at Gurston Down (see Round 6).

Trevor Willis qualified for this Run-Off but did not complete the course due to an otherwise harmless spin at Pardon hairpin.

This event was livestreamed on YouTube. Footage of the first Run-Off starts at 6:46:10. Trevor Willis's spin is shown at 6:58:30. Wallace Menzies's record run begins at 7:03:20.

=== Round 25, Craigantlet, September 11 ===
Organiser: Ulster Automobile Club

Track/weather conditions: dry

Official results
Position	Driver	Car	Time
1	Wallace Menzies	3.3 Gould GR59M-Cosworth XD	39.22 seconds
2	Alex Summers	2.65 DJ Firestorm-Cosworth XD	39.72 seconds
3	David Uren	3.5 Gould GR55-Cosworth	39.75 seconds
4	Sean Gould	4.0 Gould GR59JB-Judd	39.81 seconds
5	Scott Moran	4.0 Gould GR59-Judd	40.53 seconds
6	Trevor Willis	3.2 OMS 28-RPE	41.92 seconds
7	Richard Spedding	1.3 supercharged GWR Raptor 2-Suzuki	41.94 seconds
8	Will Hall	2.0 turbocharged Force WH-XTEC	42.25 seconds
9	David Warburton	1.6 Gould GR59-Suzuki	42.90 seconds
10	Paul Haimes	1.3 turbocharged Gould GR59-Suzuki	43.15 seconds
11	Lee Griffiths	1.7 OMS 28-Suzuki	43.75 seconds
12	Darren Gumbley	1.6 Force TA-Suzuki	45.91 seconds

Wallace Menzies scored his 52nd BHC Run-Off win in this round and in doing so scored enough points to retain his Championship title.

This event was not livestreamed.

=== Round 26, Craigantlet, September 11 ===
Organiser: Ulster Automobile Club

Track/weather conditions: dry

Official results
Position	Driver	Car	Time
1	Wallace Menzies	3.3 Gould GR59M-Cosworth XD	39.16 seconds
2	Scott Moran	4.0 Gould GR59-Judd	39.49 seconds
3	Alex Summers	2.65 DJ Firestorm-Cosworth XD	39.53 seconds
4	David Uren	3.5 Gould GR55-Cosworth	39.97 seconds
5	Sean Gould	4.0 Gould GR59JB-Judd	39.98 seconds
6	Trevor Willis	3.2 OMS 28-RPE	40.26 seconds
7	Richard Spedding	1.3 supercharged GWR Raptor 2-Suzuki	41.34 seconds
8	Paul Haimes	1.3 turbocharged Gould GR59-Suzuki	41.79 seconds
9	Will Hall	2.0 turbocharged Force WH-XTEC	42.11 seconds
10	Nicola Menzies	3.5 Gould GR55-Cosworth	42.88 seconds
11	Lee Griffiths	1.7 OMS 28-Suzuki	43.70 seconds
12	Graham Wynn	4.0 Gould GR59-Judd	44.21 seconds

Wallace Menzies scored his 53rd BHC Run-Off win in this round.

This event was not livestreamed.

=== Round 27, Loton Park, September 26 ===
Organiser: Hagley and District Light Car Club

Track/weather conditions: dry, windy

Official results
Position	Driver	Car	Time
1	Wallace Menzies	3.3 Gould GR59M-Cosworth XD	41.76 seconds R
2	Alex Summers	2.65 DJ Firestorm-Cosworth XD	42.55 seconds R
3	Scott Moran	4.0 Gould GR59-Judd	42.67 seconds R
4	Sean Gould	4.0 Gould GR59JB-Judd	42.72 seconds R
5	Trevor Willis	3.2 OMS 28-RPE	42.83 seconds R
6	David Uren	3.5 Gould GR55-Cosworth	43.61 seconds
7	David Warburton	1.6 Gould GR59-Suzuki	44.93 seconds
8	Paul Haimes	1.3 turbocharged Gould GR59-Suzuki	44.95 seconds
9	Richard Spedding	1.3 supercharged GWR Raptor 2-Suzuki	45.28 seconds
10	Matthew Ryder	1.6 Empire Wraith-Suzuki	45.75 seconds
11	Jack Cottrill	2.65 DJ Dallara-Cosworth XD	46.01 seconds
12	Graham Wynn	4.0 Gould GR59-Judd	47.34 seconds

Wallace Menzies scored his 54th BHC Run-Off win in this round. Menzies, Alex Summers, Scott Moran, Sean Gould and Trevor Willis were all under the course record of 43.18 seconds set by Gould in June 2021 and were each awarded an extra Championship point for that reason.

This event was livestreamed on YouTube. Footage of the first Run-Off starts at 3:03:40. Interviews with Scott Moran, Alex Summers and Wallace Menzies start at 3:31:00.

=== Round 28, Loton Park, September 26 ===
Organiser: Hagley and District Light Car Club

Track/weather conditions: dry, windy

Official results
Position	Driver	Car	Time
1	Wallace Menzies	3.3 Gould GR59M-Cosworth XD	41.81 seconds R
2	Alex Summers	2.65 DJ Firestorm-Cosworth XD	41.85 seconds R
3	Scott Moran	4.0 Gould GR59-Judd	42.17 seconds R
4	Trevor Willis	3.2 OMS 28-RPE	42.62 seconds R
5	Sean Gould	4.0 Gould GR59JB-Judd	43.05 seconds R
6	David Uren	3.5 Gould GR55-Cosworth	44.15 seconds
7	Paul Haimes	1.3 turbocharged Gould GR59-Suzuki	44.95 seconds
8	David Warburton	1.6 Gould GR59-Suzuki	45.06 seconds
9	Richard Spedding	1.3 supercharged GWR Raptor 2-Suzuki	45.23 seconds
10	Graham Wynn	4.0 Gould GR59-Judd	45.43 seconds
11	Matthew Ryder	1.6 Empire Wraith-Suzuki	45.65 seconds
12	Simon Moyse	1.3 supercharged Gould GR59-Suzuki	46.46 seconds

Wallace Menzies scored his 55th BHC Run-Off win in this round. No driver beat the course record set during the first Run-Off, but Menzies, Alex Summers, Scott Moran, Trevor Willis and Sean Gould each scored an extra Championship point for being under the record as it stood at the start of the meeting.

This event was livestreamed on YouTube. Footage of the second Run-Off starts at 7:11:20.

== Championship standings ==
Pos	Driver	LOT	LOT	GUR	GUR	GUR	GUR	SHE	SHE	DOU	DOU	DOU	DOU	BAR	BAR	HAR	PRE	PRE	WIS	WIS	SHE	SHE	PRE	PRE	CRA	CRA	LOT	LOT	Points
1	Wallace Menzies	10	10	10	8	**11**	10	8	9	9	9	**11**	8	10	9	10	10	10	10	10	**9**	9	9	**11**	10	10	**11**	**11**	211
2	Alex Summers	9	8	9	9	9	8	10	10	10	8	**10**	9	9	10	9	8	9	-	5	**10**	6	10	**10**	9	8	**10**	**10**	197
3	Sean Gould	-	9	7	6	8	9	9	8	-	10	8	**11**	7	8	-	9	8	9	9	**11**	7	5	6	7	6	**8**	**7**	175
4	Scott Moran	8	6	5	7	6	-	7	7	8	7	7	7	6	5	7	7	6	8	7	7	10	8	8	6	9	**9**	**9**	159
5	Trevor Willis	6	5	6	5	5	7	6	6	7	3	6	6	8	7	-	-	-	-	4	5	5	6	0	5	5	**7**	**8**	125
6	David Uren	5	4	-	-	-	-	5	5	-	6	5	5	4	6	-	-	-	-	-	6	8	7	7	8	7	5	5	98
7	Paul Haimes	-	0	4	4	0	-	4	4	4	5	2	4	3	-	-	0	5	2	8	4	4	-	3	1	3	3	4	71
8	Will Hall	7	7	8	10	7	0	-	-	-	-	-	-	-	-	-	-	-	-	-	-	-	-	5	3	2	0	0	49
9	David Warburton	-	-	2	1	0	5	3	3	-	-	-	-	2	4	2	4	3	6	0	1	0	3	1	2	-	4	3	49
10	Eynon Price	4	3	1	2	2	4	2	0	0	-	1	1	5	-	6	4	0	1	6	-	-	-	-	-	-	-	-	42
11	Richard Spedding	-	-	-	-	-	-	-	-	-	-	-	-	-	-	8	6	7	0	-	-	-	4	4	4	4	2	2	41
12	Graham Wynn	3	-	3	3	3	0	1	1	-	-	-	-	-	-	-	-	-	4	-	0	3	-	-	-	0	0	1	22
13	Stuart Sugden	-	-	-	-	-	-	-	-	6	4	3	3	-	-	-	-	-	-	-	-	-	-	-	-	-	-	-	16
14	Johnathen Varley	-	-	-	-	-	-	-	-	5	0	4	2	-	-	-	2	1	-	-	-	-	-	-	-	-	-	-	14
15=	Lee Griffiths	-	-	-	-	-	2	-	-	-	-	-	-	1	3	-	-	0	3	3	-	-	0	-	0	0	-	-	12
15=	Zachary Zammitt	-	-	-	-	-	-	-	-	-	-	-	-	-	-	-	5	4	-	-	3	-	-	-	-	-	-	-	12
17	Simon Moyse	-	-	0	-	4	6	-	-	-	-	-	-	-	1	-	-	-	-	-	0	0	0	-	-	-	-	0	11
18=	Andy Greenen	-	-	0	0	-	-	-	0	1	2	-	-	-	-	5	-	-	-	-	-	-	-	-	-	-	-	-	8
18=	Matthew Ryder	0	-	-	-	-	-	0	-	-	-	-	-	-	0	-	-	-	7	-	-	-	-	-	-	-	1	0	8
20=	Jack Cottrill	-	-	-	-	-	-	-	-	-	-	-	-	-	-	-	-	-	-	-	2	1	2	2	-	-	0	-	7
20=	Harry Pick	-	-	-	-	-	-	-	-	3	1	-	-	0	-	3	-	-	-	0	-	-	-	-	-	-	-	-	7
20=	Allan Warburton	-	-	-	-	-	3	-	-	-	-	-	-	-	-	4	-	-	-	-	-	-	-	-	-	-	-	-	7
23	Jason Tunnicliffe	-	-	-	-	-	-	-	-	-	-	-	-	-	-	-	-	-	5	-	-	-	-	-	-	-	-	-	5
24=	Andrew Coley	2	1	-	-	-	-	-	-	-	-	-	-	-	-	-	-	-	-	-	-	-	-	-	-	-	-	-	3
24=	Adam Greenen	1	0	-	-	-	0	0	2	-	-	-	-	-	-	-	0	-	-	-	-	-	-	-	-	-	-	-	3
24=	Darren Gumbley	-	-	-	-	-	-	-	-	-	-	-	-	-	-	-	-	-	0	2	-	-	1	-	0	-	-	-	3
24=	Charles Hall	-	-	-	-	-	-	-	-	-	-	-	-	-	-	-	1	2	-	-	-	-	-	0	-	-	-	-	3
24=	Nicola Menzies	-	-	-	-	-	-	-	-	-	-	-	-	-	-	-	-	-	-	-	-	2	-	-	-	1	-	-	3
29=	Olivia Cooper	-	-	-	-	-	-	-	-	0	0	0	0	0	2	-	-	-	-	-	-	-	-	-	-	-	-	-	2
29=	Leslie Mutch	-	-	-	-	-	-	-	-	-	2	0	0	-	-	-	-	-	-	-	-	-	-	-	-	-	-	-	2
29=	Ben Stephenson	-	2	-	-	-	-	-	-	-	-	-	-	-	-	-	-	-	-	-	-	-	-	-	-	-	-	-	2
32=	Kelvin Broad	-	-	-	-	-	-	-	-	-	-	-	-	-	-	-	-	-	-	1	-	-	-	-	-	-	-	-	1
32=	Liam Cooper	-	-	-	-	-	-	-	-	-	-	-	-	-	-	1	-	-	-	-	-	-	-	-	-	-	-	-	1
32=	Steve Owen	0	-	-	0	1	-	-	-	-	-	-	-	-	-	-	-	-	-	-	-	-	-	-	-	-	-	-	1

- Bold text denotes that a score includes an extra point for being under the outright course record as it stood at the start of the meeting.
- Italic text on a dark background indicates a dropped score (applicable when the driver has scored points in more than the maximum number of counting rounds).
- Scores supplied by the Championship organisers.
- - = driver did not qualify the Run-Off.
- 0 = driver qualified for the Run-Off but did not score points.
- This table includes only those drivers who have scored points in at least one Run-Off.

== BHC Cup ==
The Motorsport UK British Hillclimb Championship Cup presented by Footman James (formerly the British Hillclimb Leaders Championship), informally referred to as the BHC Cup, allows drivers with very different types of car to compete on equal terms. Points are awarded according to a driver's positions in each of the two class runs held at every event. Drivers who are not registered for the BHC Cup do not score points, but they can affect the scores of those who are registered. For example, the fastest registered driver in a class will score points for second place if beaten by a non-registered driver.

The scoring system is based initially on the assumption that there are six or more starters in the class, but is adjusted if there are five or fewer, as follows:

Points
**No. of starters**	**1st**	**2nd**	**3rd**	**4th**	**5th**	**6th**
6 or more	9	6	4	3	2	1
5	9	6	4	3	1	-
4	9	6	4	1	-	-
3	9	4	1	-	-	-
2	6	1	-	-	-	-
1	4	-	-	-	-	-

In addition, an extra point is awarded to any driver whose time is under the class record at the start of the event. To clarify, the extra point is awarded if that record is beaten in the second class run even if a new record has been set in the first class run.

All BHC Cup rounds are held at British Hillclimb Championship meetings, but only those which take place on the British mainland. No BHC Cup rounds are held on the Channel Islands hills of Bouley Bay and Val des Terres (where the relevant events were in any case cancelled for the 2021 season - see 'Calendar changes' above) or at Craigantlet in Northern Ireland.

Assuming the planned 26 rounds are held, a driver's best 16 scores will count towards their total, though this number will be reduced if any rounds are cancelled.

Wallace Menzies completed the unusual double of winning both the BHC and the BHC Cup in the same season. Second place went to Tom Weaver, who began competing at the age of 16 in March 2019.

Pos	Driver	Car	LOT	LOT	GUR	GUR	GUR	GUR	SHE	SHE	DOU	DOU	DOU	DOU	BAR	BAR	HAR	PRE	PRE	WIS	WIS	SHE	SHE	PRE	PRE	LOT	LOT	Points
1	Wallace Menzies	Gould GR59M	9	9	6	3	9	6	3	6	9	6	9	4	9	9	9	6	3	9	9	5	**10**	9	**10**	**10**	**10**	139
2	Tom Weaver	Van Diemen RF91	2	6	9	4	1	6	2	9	3	9	**10**	**10**	-	-	9	9	9	-	-	9	9	9	4	9	9	131
3	David Warburton	Gould GR59	0	3	6	6	9	9	9	9	0	-	-	-	9	9	3	9	9	4	6	6	9	9	9	9	9	129
4	Lee Griffiths	OMS 28	9	9	9	9	9	9	0	3	6	6	6	6	6	6	4	**7**	**7**	9	9	6	6	**10**	9	2	9	126
5=	Adam Greenen	Empire Evo 2	9	9	6	6	6	9	9	9	1	2	-	-	4	9	3	9	9	-	6	9	3	9	9	-	-	123
5=	Johnathen Varley	GWR Predator	-	-	-	-	-	-	9	9	9	9	9	**10**	-	-	3	**10**	**10**	6	6	9	9	-	-	9	6	123
7	Gavin Neate	Peugeot 106	9	9	4	4	9	9	9	9	**7**	**7**	**7**	0	-	-	**10**	9	9	-	-	9	4	-	-	-	-	120
8=	Andy Greenen	Empire Evo 2	0	4	9	9	9	6	4	6	6	9	-	-	3	9	9	6	6	6	3	6	9	6	4	-	-	111
8=	Allan McDonald	Morris Mini Evo	9	9	6	6	6	6	9	4	6	6	6	1	-	-	-	6	6	4	4	9	9	4	4	9	9	111
8=	Eynon Price	Force TA	9	9	9	9	6	6	6	6	9	4	6	6	6	0	2	4	3	9	9	1	6	3	4	-	-	111
11	Sean Gould	Gould GR59JB	0	6	9	9	3	9	6	1	0	9	6	6	3	4	2	**10**	**10**	4	6	**7**	**7**	4	0	5	3	109
12	John Pick	AMS Murtaya	6	6	4	4	1	6	9	9	4	4	9	4	9	9	6	-	-	-	-	9	9	6	6	4	1	107
13	Simon Jenks	Caterham S3	6	9	9	9	9	9	6	6	6	6	6	9	-	-	6	3	3	-	-	4	6	4	3	3	3	106
14=	Justin Andrews	Subaru Impreza	4	6	9	4	4	4	9	9	9	9	9	9	6	6	6	6	9	-	-	-	-	-	-	-	-	105
14=	Damien Bradley	Subaru Legacy	3	-	4	4	3	4	6	9	4	4	4	4	4	**5**	9	9	9	9	6	9	9	4	9	-	-	105
16	Alex Summers	DJ Firestorm	6	1	2	4	6	4	9	9	6	4	4	**10**	6	6	3	4	6	2	2	**10**	2	6	6	**7**	**7**	104
17	James Kerr	Peugeot 205 GTi	4	9	6	9	6	9	4	3	6	6	6	6	6	6	9	3	2	6	6	4	4	4	6	-	-	102
18	Harry Pick	OMS 3000M	-	-	4	4	-	4	6	4	9	6	9	-	9	-	-	-	-	9	9	1	2	4	3	9	9	108
19	Michael Thomson	Honda S2000	3	4	4	4	4	4	0	2	-	-	-	-	9	**10**	6	9	**10**	-	-	3	3	**10**	-	6	9	95
20=	Timothy Higgins	Westfield SEi	9	9	1	1	4	1	4	4	1	1	1	1	4	1	1	9	9	4	4	1	1	9	9	9	6	94
20=	Richard Weaver	Van Diemen RF91	9	4	4	9	6	1	9	6	4	4	**5**	**7**	-	-	1	4	4	-	-	6	4	6	9	6	3	94

- Bold text denotes that a score includes an extra point for being under the class record as it stood at the start of the meeting.
- Italic text on a dark background indicates a dropped score (applicable when the driver has scored points in more than the maximum number of counting rounds).
- - = driver did not take part in the round.
- 0 = driver took part in the round but did not score points.
- Only the top 21 of the 83 points scorers are shown.
- Scores supplied by the Championship organisers.
