= Hillclimbing in the British Isles =

Style of motorsport

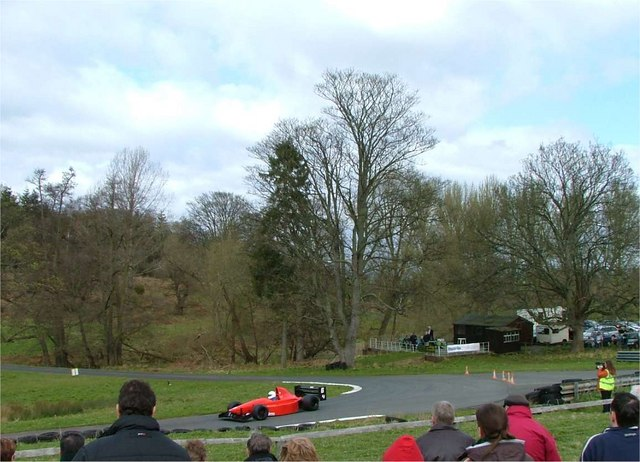
Triangle corner, Loton Park

Hillclimbing in Great Britain differs from the style of hillclimb motorsport events staged in many other parts of the world, in that courses are generally short — mostly under one mile (1.6 km) in length — and this means that cars and drivers do not generally cross between British events and the longer hillclimbs found in many other parts of Europe.

In the United Kingdom, hillclimbing is considered a spectator sport, and the most prestigious events, such as those that form part of the British Hill Climb Championship, often attract several thousand enthusiasts to the hills. All the courses in Great Britain are situated on private land, but some events in the Channel Islands and all events in Northern Ireland are held on closed public roads. Track lengths are traditionally quoted in yards: the longest hillclimb course in the UK is Cairncastle at 2904 yards (2655 m) and one of the shortest is Val des Terres at 850 yards (777 m).

The Scottish championship has long been associated with names like Grampian TV and Guyson. Doune and Fintray continue to be included in the championship along with newer venue Forrestburn. Two other venues, Rumster and Kinkell are no longer in use. A notable feature of British and Irish hillclimbing is the very wide variety of vehicles used for competition. Both cars and motorcycles (including sidecars) take part in the sport, and in the case of cars these range from almost standard machines (sometimes driven to and from the tracks) with the only modifications being those required on grounds of safety, right through to specially-built single-seater racing cars. Classic and vintage cars are also very popular in hillclimbing. Generally there are separate meetings for cars and bikes, but occasionally both appear at the same event.

In Great Britain, there is a system of classes which groups cars into broadly similar categories. For example, the classes for "Racing Cars" (i.e. single-seaters) are divided into those for cars with engine capacities of under 600cc, 600–1100 cc, 1100–1600 cc, 1600–2000 cc and over 2000 cc. The cars in the unlimited capacity class often use engines from, or derived from, Formula One cars, and occasionally F1 cars themselves have competed. Motorcycles are generally classified by engine capacity, though separate classes exist for trikes and sidecar outfits. Drivers entered for the British Hill Climb Championship may qualify for a "run-off" at the end of each set of class runs, and it is here that BHCC or NHCA championship points are scored.

It is common for two drivers, often but not always related, to share the same vehicle at a hillclimb. Such entries are known as "dual-driven" (or, occasionally, "double-driven") cars or bikes. Usually drivers considered the slower in such partnerships will make the climb first, before the bulk of the class for which they have been entered. This therefore allows their companions to make their ascent within the same time frame as the competitors, to ensure similar track conditions. Other than this, there is no special consideration for drivers in dual-driven cars, and both drivers count their results (and, if appropriate, score points) individually.

== Hills used in the British Hill Climb Championship ==
- Barbon, Cumbria (course length 890 yd / 814 m)
- Bouley Bay, Jersey
- Craigantlet, County Down (1460 yd / 1335 m)
- Doune, Perthshire (1476 yd / 1350 m)
- Gurston Down, Wiltshire (1057 yd / 967 m)
- Harewood, Yorkshire (1583 yd / 1447 m)
- Loton Park, Shropshire (1475 yd / 1349 m)
- Prescott, Gloucestershire (1127 yd / 1031 m)
- Shelsley Walsh, Worcestershire (1000 yd / 914 m)
- Val des Terres, Guernsey (850 yd / 777 m)
- Wiscombe Park, Devon (1000 yd / 914 m)

== Hills used in the National (Motorcycle) Hill Climb Championship ==
- Barbon, Cumbria (course length 890 yd / 814 m)
- Castle Hill Climb, near Lostwithiel, Cornwall
- Curborough Sprint Course, Staffordshire (909 yd / 831 m)
- Gurston Down, Wiltshire (1057 yd / 967 m)
- Harewood, Yorkshire (1583 yd / 1447 m)
- Hartland Quay, Devon
- Loton Park, Shropshire (1475 yd / 1349 m)
- Prescott, Gloucestershire (1127 yd / 1031 m)
- Shelsley Walsh, Worcestershire (1000 yd / 914 m)
- Tregrehan, Cornwall (440 yd / 402 m)
- Wiscombe Park, Devon (1000 yd / 914 m)

== Non-championship hills ==
- Bo'ness Hill Climb, West Lothian, former BHCC venue.
- Fintray Hillclimb, Aberdeenshire, former BHCC venue.
- Forrestburn Hillclimb, North Lanarkshire
- Goodwood Festival of Speed, West Sussex (1.16 miles / 1.86 km)
- Chateau Impney Hill Climb near Droitwich Spa, Worcestershire
- Llys y Fran, Pembrokeshire (0.45 miles / 0.72 km) – the only hillclimb in Wales.
- Cairncastle Hillclimb, Northern Ireland (1.65 miles)

== Disused Hillclimb venues ==
- Firle Hill Climb, East Sussex
- Great Auclum National Speed Hill Climb, Berkshire, former BHCC venue.
- Harting Hill Climb, West Sussex.
- Kinkell Braes, St. Andrews, Scotland
- Rest and Be Thankful Speed Hill Climb, Argyll, former BHCC venue.
- Rumster, Caithness. Operated by Caithness Car Club
- Westbrook Hay Hill Climb, Hertfordshire, former BHCC venue.
- Manor Farm Hill Climb, Charmouth, Dorset

== See also ==
- British Hill Climb Championship
- Lewes Speed Trials
- European Hill Climb Championship
