= Barbon Hillclimb =

Hillclimb in Cumbria, England

Barbon Manor
- Location: Barbon; Cumbria; England
- Time zone: GMT
- Coordinates: 54°14′13″N 2°33′51″W postcode LA6 2LJ
- Major Events: British Hill Climb Championship
- Hill Length: 890 yards (810 m)
- Turns: 3
- Hill Record: 20.08 (Jos Goodyear, 2015, British Hillclimb Championship)

Barbon Hillclimb is a hillclimb held near Kirkby Lonsdale, Cumbria, north-west England. The event is held on the Barbon Manor estate with the course ordinarily being used as a driveway to Barbon Manor, a Victorian shooting lodge. (The Manor house is not open to the public). The course is 738 yards (675 metres) in length, making it the shortest of the British Hill Climb Championship tracks outside the Channel Islands. Since 2013, the car events have been promoted by Liverpool Motor Club in addition to their popular Sprints at Aintree.

Motorcycle events were run at Barbon by the Westmorland Motor Club until 2011, but resumed in 2019.

== History ==
From 1950 to 2012, Westmorland Motor Club ran three events per year at the venue: two for cars and one for motorcycles, though the motorcycle events took a break in 2011 but ran again in 2019. Since 2013 the car events have been run by Barbon Hillclimb Ltd, a joint venture between Kirkby Londsdale Motor Club and Liverpool Motor Club, the latter being the official promoter of the events.

The target for 1963 competitors was the existing record by Jack Cordingley's JBW-Maserati in a time of 30.46 secs. A new hill record was set by Jos Goodyear on 4 July 2015 of 20.08 secs, beating the previous record held by Scott Moran in 2008. Goodyear's record still stands despite several competitors getting very close to breaking it.

Substantial re-surfacing took place in 2015 and the British Hillclimb Championship event moved from May to July to further improve the events for competitors and spectators alike. The British Championship rounds last visited Barbon in 2019.

The venue hosts Regional and National Championship car events in June and July each year, attracting a loyal following of competitors and spectators.

== Barbon Hillclimb car event past winners ==
Year	Driver	Vehicle	Time	Notes
1950	Peter Holyoak	Closed to club test event	87.20 secs	(150yds longer)
1951	B Crabtree	MG	37.20 secs R	
1952	Gillie Tyrer	Fraser Nash BMW	35.40 secs R	
1953	B Crabtree	MG	36.20 secs	
1954	I E Davison	Cooper MG	34.07 secs R	
1955	P.S. Hughes	Tojeiro-J.A.P.	34.68 secs	21 May.
1956	C.A.N. May	Cooper-J.A.P. Mark 8	32.18 secs R	26 May.
1957	Peter Proctor	Cooper-Norton	33.37 secs	26 May.
1963	Tony Marsh	Marsh Climax	28.779 secs R	25 May.
1964	Peter Westbury	Ferguson P99 Climax	27.17 secs R	23 May.
1965	Peter Boshier-Jones	Lotus		
1966	Tony Marsh	Marsh Special GM	31.37 secs	
1967	David Good	B.R.M. 4-w-d		20 May.
1968	Peter Lawson	BRM P67	27.38 sec	
1969	Round 4 D. Hepworth	Hepworth FF Traco-Oldsmobile	26.78 sec R	
1998	British Hill Climb Championship : David Grace	Gould Ralt GR37	21.04 sec	
1999	British Hill Climb Championship : David Grace	Gould Ralt GR37	21.11 sec	
2000	British Hill Climb Championship : David Grace	Gould Ralt GR37	20.86 sec R	
2001	Meeting Cancelled (Foot & Mouth Disease)			
2002	British Hill Climb Championship : Graeme Wright Jnr	Gould GR51 V6	21.02 sec	
2003	British Hill Climb Championship : Graeme Wright Jnr	Gould GR51 V6	21.05 sec	
2004	British Hill Climb Championship : Adam Fleetwood	Gould GR..	20.51 sec R	
2005	British Hill Climb Championship : Martin Groves	Gould GR55	20.91 sec	
2006	British Hill Climb Championship : Martin Groves	Gould GR55	21.17 sec	
2007	British Hill Climb Championship : Martin Groves	Gould GR55	20.71 sec	
2008	British Hill Climb Championship : Scott Moran	Gould GR61X	20.50 sec R	
2009	British Hill Climb Championship : Martin Groves	Gould GR55	21.58 sec	
2010	British Hill Climb Championship : Wallace Menzies	DJ Firestorm	21.61 sec	
2011	British Hill Climb Championship : Scott Moran	Gould GR61X	21.29 sec	
2012	British Hill Climb Championship : Scott Moran	Gould GR61X	20.51 sec	
2013	British Hill Climb Championship : Trevor Willis	OMS 28	21.69 sec	
2014	British Hill Climb Championship : Trevor Willis	OMS 28	21.81 sec	
2015	British Hill Climb Championship : Jos Goodyear	GWR Raptor	20.08 sec R	
2016	British Hill Climb Championship : Trevor Willis	OMS 28	22.34 sec	
2017	British Hill Climb Championship : Meeting Cancelled due to weather			

Key: R = New Course Record. All details extracted from Barbon Hillclimb Programmes unless indicated otherwise
