= Bo'ness Hill Climb =

British motorsport event

Bo'ness Hillclimb
- Location: Bo'ness, West Lothian, Scotland

Bo'ness Hill Climb is a hillclimbing course on the Kinneil Estate (site of the historic Kinneil House near Bo'ness, Scotland. It is sometimes referred to as Kinneil Hill Climb. Opening in 1932, it was Scotland's first purpose-built motorsport venue.

== History ==
In 1932 and 1933 events were organised, for motorbikes only, by the West Lothian Motor Cycle Club. The first meeting open to both cars and bikes was organised jointly by WLMCC, Scottish Sporting Car Club and Bo'ness Town Council. There were plans to build a racing circuit on the same land, effectively turning Kinneil into a motorsport complex, but they never came to anything.

In March 1947 Motor Sport reported: "Kinneil hill at Bo'ness will provide an 880-yard course, having been lengthened by 140 yds." However, this was by no means the first alteration to the track. From 1932 to 1935 it consisted simply of a straight road running from the Courtyard section. The start line was moved downhill in 1936, so drivers had to negotiate what is now known as Old Paddock bend and the entrance to the Courtyard. The following year, it was moved further still, bringing Crawyett bend into play. At the same time, a fast right-left called the Snake was introduced to the upper part of the course.

The first round of the inaugural British Hill Climb Championship was staged at Bo'ness on 17 May 1947. It was won by George Abecassis, who went on to finish second in the Championship to Raymond Mays. The other four rounds that year were held at Bouley Bay, Craigantlet, Prescott and Shelsley Walsh. Unlike Bo'ness, all of these are still used as Championship venues.

On the evening of 29 June 1953, the BBC organised a special televised event with an 'England versus Scotland' format. Competitors ran in matched pairs with two points for a win and three where the class record was broken. The final score was England 26, Scotland 16. Ken Wharton broke the absolute hill record in 33.61 seconds, "but it was not felt that these could be accepted as 'official' times."

Scottish Sporting Car Club continued to organise events at Bo'ness until the low driver and spectator numbers persuaded them to stop after the 1954 season. Lothian Car Club brought the venue back to life in 1959 but was forced to abandon it after the June 1966 meeting when Bo'ness Town Council sold the upper section to a developer. A large part of the track, including Snake Bend, is now covered by a housing estate, but a small brick enclosure built to protect the timing gear at the finish line is still visible on the path alongside Provost Road which was formerly the top straight. Lothian CC began running events at Doune in 1968 and has continued to do so for over 50 years.

In 2007 a Revival Club was formed with a view of running speed hill climbing again at Bo'ness. Revival meetings have been held every year since 2008 and are open to classic and historic cars.

== Past winners ==
Year	Driver	Vehicle	Winning Time	Notes
1934	A.K.B.Clarkson	Ford V8	36.25 sec	23 June.
1935	R. Alexander	Ford V8	34.0 sec	6 July.
1936	I.O.K. Stuart	Squire	35.5 sec	
1936	S. Weston	M.G.-PB	45.0 sec	Described as a speed trial. Start line moved downhill to extend course.
1937	T.W. Meikle	Frazer-Nash	38.5 sec	Start line moved further downhill, Snake Bend chicane added to final straight.
1938	Harry Souter	Bugatti Special	36.8 sec R	15 May.
1938	Harry Souter	Bugatti Special	35.3 sec R	20 August.
1939	George Moncreiff	Riley (known today as the Gillow Special)	33.8 sec R	13 May. Moncreiff was referred to in contemporary reports as G.J.W. Moncrieff, a mis-spelling of his surname which has also occurred in military documents. His winning run at this event was the fastest achieved by any car at Bo'ness before the Second World War.
1946	Noel Bean	SS Jaguar 100	40.0 sec	11 May.
1946	Leslie Johnson	Darracq 3,996 c.c.	40.5 sec	7 September, wet, course extended 80 yds.
1947	George Abecassis	Bugatti 3.3	38.2 sec R	17 May.
1947	M. R. Chassels	Frazer-Nash 1,496 c.c.	41.9 sec	
1947	Sydney Allard	Steyr-Allard	41.70 sec	20 September.
1948	Bob Gerard	E.R.A.	36.3 sec R	26 June.
1948	K.N. Hutchison	Alfa Romeo	37.4 sec	18 September.
1949	Dennis Poore	Alfa Romeo	33.9 sec R	25 June.
1950	Ken Wharton	Cooper 996 c.c.	38.41 sec	24 June.
1950	M. R. Chassels	Chassels Special 3,917 c.c.	39.07 sec	30 September.
1951	Ken Wharton	Cooper 1,000 c.c. s/c	34.60 sec	30 June.
1951	Jack Walton	Frazer Nash	38.28 sec	29 September.
1952	Ken Wharton	Cooper	34.50 sec	28 June.
1953	Ron Flockhart	ERA R4D	33.82 sec R	28 June.
1953	Ken Wharton	Cooper	33.61 sec R	29 June; evening meeting.
1954	Ken Wharton	Cooper 996 c.c. s/c	33.76 sec	26 June.
1954	P.S. Hughes	Tojeiro	38.51 sec	11 September.
1955-1958 No events.
1959	Jim Clark	Lister-Jaguar	34.1 sec	11 July.
1960	David Boshier-Jones	Cooper JAP	32.80 sec R	25 June.
1961	David Good	Cooper JAP Mk8	33.07 sec	24 June.
1962	Tony Marsh	Marsh Special	30.99 sec R	
1963	Tony Marsh	B.R.M. 2.5-litre	31.16 sec	22 June.
1964	Peter Westbury	Ferguson-BRM	29.87 sec R	16 July. This was the only time of under 30 seconds set by a car at Bo'ness. Another was set by a motorcycle on the shorter course in the 1930s.
1965	Tony Marsh	Marsh Special	30.07 sec	23 June.
1966	Brian Eccles	Brabham BT14-Oldsmobile	31.13 sec	

Key: R = Course Record.

== See also ==
- Fintray Hillclimb
- Forrestburn Hillclimb
- Rest and Be Thankful Speed Hill Climb.
