= Rest and Be Thankful Speed Hill Climb =

Coordinates: 56.2143°N 4.8387°W

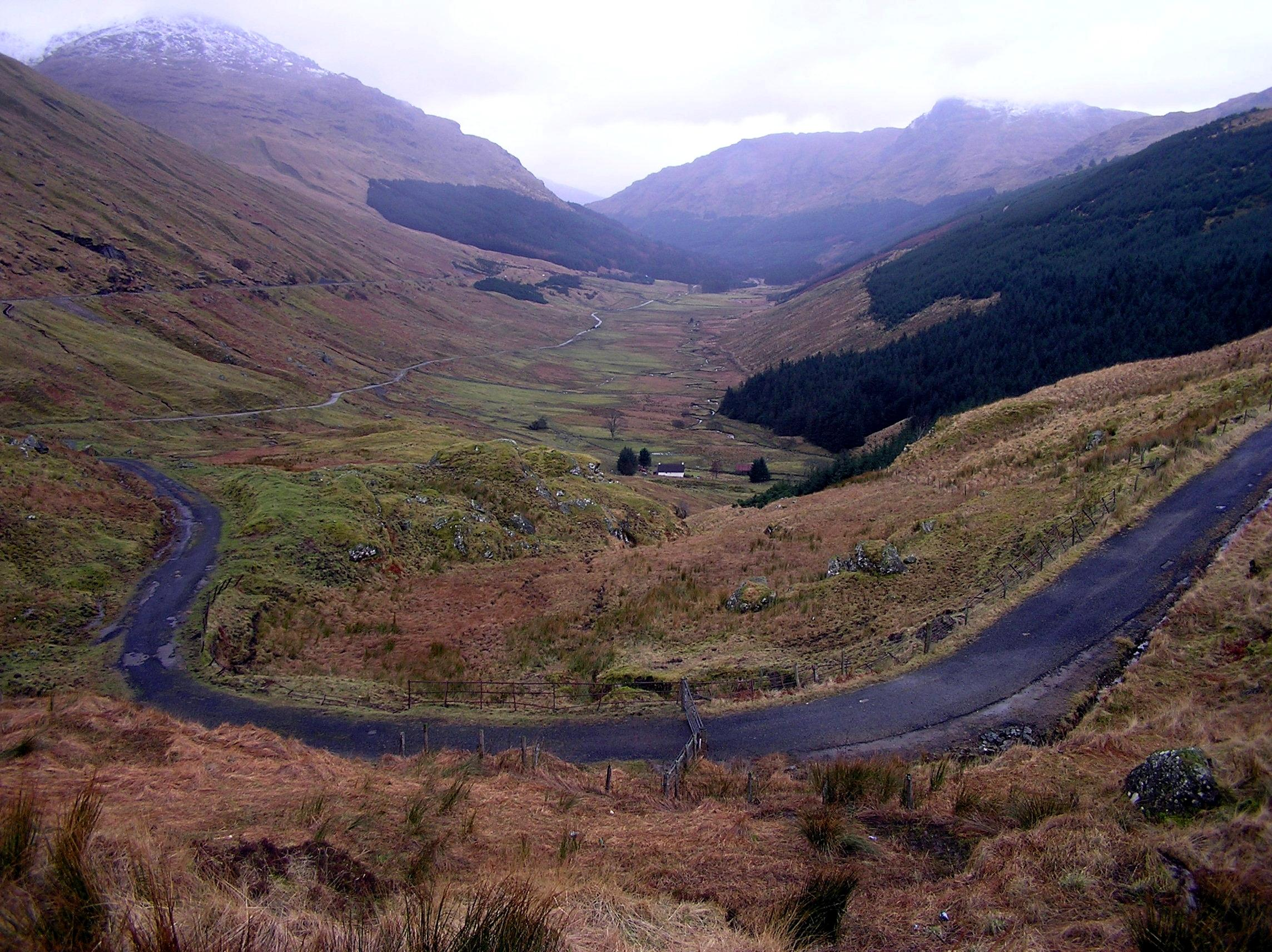
Glen Croe viewed from Rest and be thankful viewpoint

Rest and Be Thankful Hill Climb is a disused hillclimbing course in Glen Croe, on the Cowal Peninsula, in Argyll and Bute, west of Scotland. The first known use of the road for a hillclimb was in 1906. The event used to count towards the British Hill Climb Championship. It is named for the Rest and be thankful, a steep incline, on a section of the old military road in Glen Croe, leading to the pass into Glen Kinglas.

== Descriptions ==
In 1952 Motor Sport described the course: "The three danger spots on this course which is 1,425 yards [1,303 m] long, and rises over 400 feet [120 m], are Stone Bridge, Cobblers Corner and the hairpin bend at the finish and of course there is always the occasional sheep that has to be driven off the road."

On 1 July 1961 Jackie Stewart drove a Ford 105E-engined Marcos at an event here. He said: "it's a special place for me, the cradle of my life in motor racing."

In 1970 Motor wrote:

"The Rest, the famous Scottish Rest and Be Thankful Hill climb, will be used for the last time this year. Like many long established venues, time has overtaken it from the safety angle. A lot of money needs to be spent on barriers and banks and the Royal Scottish Automobile Club who run the National Open Hill Climb there say it will cost far too much; so this year it will only be used by clubs for restricted events and then no more."

The venue has also been used for rally special stages and classic car events. The "Friends of the Rest" are working to revive the course (2009).

In September 2018 a project to establish a Scottish Motorsport Heritage Centre at the Rest and Be Thankful was granted official charitable status.

== Past winners ==
Year	Driver	Vehicle	Time	Notes
1906	Broome White	Mercedes 60 h.p.	2m 19sec	Distance about 1 mile.
1949	Raymond Mays	E.R.A.	68.00 sec	9 July; 1,800 yards.
1950	Dennis Poore	Alfa Romeo #65	57.60 sec	1 July.
1951	Dennis Poore	Alfa Romeo	56.32 sec	7 July; 1,425 yards; wet.
1952	Ken Wharton	Cooper	54.23 sec R	5 July; 1,425 yards; fine.
1953	Michael Christie	Cooper-J.A.P. 1,100 c.c.	55.81 sec	4 July.
1954	Michael Christie	Cooper 1,098 c.c. s/c	63.87 sec	3 July; 1,425 yards; wet.
1955	Tony Marsh	Cooper #96	56.12 sec	
1956	Tony Marsh	Cooper 1,100 c.c.	53.75 sec R	
1957	Tony Marsh	Cooper-J.A.P.	56.31 sec	Showers.
1958	David Boshier-Jones	Cooper-J.A.P.	53.82 sec	
1959	David Boshier-Jones	Cooper-J.A.P.	55.45 sec	4 July.
1960	David Boshier-Jones	Cooper-J.A.P.	52.05 sec	1 July.
1961	Tony Marsh	Lotus-Climax 1,500 c.c.	54.04 sec	1 July, wet to sunny.
1962	Tony Marsh	Marsh Special	52.52 sec	
1963	Peter Westbury	Felday-Daimler 2.6-litre s/c		29 June.
1964				27 June.
1965	Peter Meldrum	Lotus 20-Allard s/c		
1966	Peter Boshier-Jones	Lotus-Climax 1,200 c.c.	50.88 sec	2 July.
1967	Tony Marsh	Marsh Special		2 July.
1968	Martin Brain	Cooper T81B F1-1-67-Chrysler V8 7.2-litre		29 June.
1969	David Hepworth	Hepworth Traco FF Chevrolet 4.5-litre	53.07 sec	
1970	Ted Clark	Lotus 51	55.26 sec	16 May. Round 2 of the inaugural Scottish Hillclimb Championship.
1970	Jim Dickson	BVRT Mini	58.63 sec	12 September. Round 5 of the inaugural Scottish Hillclimb Championship. Final hillclimb event at the Rest and Be Thankful.

Key: R = Course Record.

== See also ==
- Bo'ness Hill Climb
- Doune Hillclimb
- Fintray Hillclimb
- Forrestburn Hillclimb
