= Bouley Bay Hill Climb =

Coordinates: 49.23937°N 2.08191°W

Bouley Bay
- Location: Trinity, Jersey
- Time zone: GMT
- Opened: 1921
- Major Events: British Hill Climb Championship
- Hill Length: 1,011 yards (924 m)
- Hill Record: 37.60 (Wallace Menzies, 2013, British Hill Climb Championship)

Bouley Bay Hill Climb is a hillclimbing event held in Trinity, Jersey, and organised by The Jersey Motor Cycle and Light Car Club. The course on Les Charrières du Boulay was "first used for competition in 1921" and since 1947 has hosted a round (latterly two rounds) of the British Hill Climb Championship. Bouley Bay and Val des Terres hill climb in Guernsey are normally held in July and provide a two-stop tour for UK drivers contesting the series.

Of the 1947 event Raymond Mays said: "My E.R.A.'s time counted as a record because, although it was slower than the figure set the previous year by Bainbridge's 1½-litre E.R.A., the 1947 climb was run for the first time from a standing start."

The 2008 meeting included rounds 17 and 18 of the British Hill Climb Championship, both being won by Scott Moran.

== Bouley Bay Hill Climb past winners ==
Year	Driver	Vehicle	Time	Notes
1946	G. Bainbridge	E.R.A.	55.9 sec	
1947	Raymond Mays	E.R.A.	59.8 sec R	24 July.
1948	Joe Fry	Freikaiserwagen	59.2 sec	15 July, joint fastest.
1948	Dennis Poore	Alfa Romeo	59.2 sec	15 July, joint fastest.
1949	Sydney Allard	Steyr-Allard	55.6 sec	21 July. Course reduced 50 yards.
1950	Ken Wharton	Cooper 998 c.c.	55.4 sec	
1951	Ken Wharton	Cooper 998 c.c. s/c	54.2 sec R	26 July.
1952	Ken Wharton	Cooper 998 c.c. s/c	55.4 sec	
1953	Ken Wharton	Cooper-J.A.P.	52.8 sec R	23 July.
1954	Ken Wharton	Cooper 996 s/c	53.6 sec	Thurs 22 July.
1955	Ken Wharton	Cooper 996 s/c	53.0 sec	21 July; 1,011 yards.
1956	Ken Wharton	Cooper 1,100 c.c.	52.6 sec R	
1957	Tony Marsh	Cooper-J.A.P. 1,098 c.c.	53.3 sec	
1958	David Boshier-Jones	Cooper-J.A.P.	53.82 sec	
1959	David Boshier-Jones	Cooper-J.A.P.	51.00 sec	
1960	David Boshier-Jones	Cooper 1,098 c.c.	50.84 sec R	Rain led to abandonment.
1961	Mac Daghorn	Cooper-J.A.P.	51.75 sec	Oil on course led to abandonment.
1962	Tico Martini	Martini-Special 650 c.c.	50.63 sec R	26 July.
1963				25 July.
1964				23 July.
1965	Tony Marsh	Marsh-Special	R	22 July.
1966	Tony Marsh	Marsh-GM	50.21 sec	
1967	Round 7 :Tony Marsh	Marsh Special	45.26 sec	
1968				
1969	Mike MacDowel	Brabham BT30X-Climax V8	45.61 sec	
1970	David Hepworth	Hepworth FF	FTD	Oct. Postponed due to dock strike.
1971				
1972	Sir N. Williamson	March 712S-Hart 2.0-litre	43.15 sec R	
1973	Mike MacDowel	Brabham BT36X-Repco 5-litre	43.09 sec R	
1974	Chris Cramer			
1975	Roy Lane			
1976	Sir Nicholas Williamson	March 741 DFV 3.0-litre	42.12 sec R	
1977	Alister Douglas-Osborn	Pilbeam R22 3.0-litre	42.48 sec	
1987	Round 9 : Martyn Griffiths	Pilbeam MP53-Hart 2.8-litre	40.30 sec	23 July.
1995	Round 10 : Andy Priaulx	Pilbeam MP58/03-Ford DFL 4-litre	38.65 sec R	
1996	Round 10 : Roger Moran	Pilbeam MP72/3-Judd EV 3.5-litre	39.64 sec	18 July.
2008	Round 17 : Scott Moran	Gould-GR61	38.82 sec	17 July.
2008	Round 18 : Scott Moran	Gould-GR61	38.77 sec	17 July.
2009	Round 19 : Roger Moran	Gould-NME GR61X 3.5-litre	38.37 sec	16 July.
2009	Round 20 : Scott Moran	Gould-NME GR61X 3.5-litre	39.44 sec	16 July.

Key: R = Course Record; FTD = Fastest Time of the Day.

== See also ==
- Val des Terres Hill Climb
