= Martin Grove =

Martin Grove could mean any of the following:

- Martin Grove Road, a secondary north–south thoroughfare in Etobicoke and Vaughan, in the province of Ontario, Canada
- Martingrove Collegiate Institute, a secondary school in Etobicoke, Toronto, Ontario, Canada
- Martin Grove Brumbaugh (1862–1930), an American politician
- Martin Groves, a British hillclimb driver
