= Firle Hill Climb =

Hillclimbing course near Lewes, East Sussex, England

Coordinates: 50.8258°N 0.1225°E

Firle Hill Climb is a disused hillclimbing course near Lewes, East Sussex, England, sometimes referred to as Bo Peep Hill Climb. The event was celebrated on 20 September 2015 by the Bo Peep Drivers Club.

The event will consist of a timed climb of the metalled road known as Bo-Peep Hill, situated near the village of Selmeston, on a turning off the A27. Map reference No. 183/498053. Each competitor will be permitted two timed runs in addition to practice."

In 1966, The Autocar reported: " The hill covers 600 yards, and if the weather is fine the setting is really superb."

== History ==
The situation faced by the racing motorist in England after World War Two was bleak. Brooklands was permanently closed and Donington Park was out of action. Two other obstacles were petrol rationing, which was not abolished until 26 May 1950, and an acute shortage of tyres, the R.A.C. having banned retreaded or remoulded tyres from competition. The search was on for a place to race. The Bentley Drivers' Club found Firle. W.O. Bentley attended the race here in 1951.

The BARC event held on Sunday 2 June 1957, was run in conjunction with the BARC 11th Annual Rally at Eastbourne, a 50-mile road event held the day before, starting at the Grasshopper Inn near Westerham, with intermittent driving tests, including one at Butts Hill, Willingdon, and then on to Eastbourne, via Beachy Head. A steward of the rally was Captain A. Frazer-Nash, M.I.Mech.E.

On 14 September 1958, Tony Marsh set an unofficial record of 25.31 sec during a demonstration run: "He chose to run in the big twin Cooper rather than the Formula 2 car, the former being less of a handful on Firle's somewhat bumpy surface."

A report from 1965 states: "Once again, many of the hill records were lowered, including the absolute record for the hill, which came down from 24.45 seconds, set up by Miss Patsy Burt in 1963, to 23.87 seconds standing to Gordon Parker in a Cooper Climax. Patsy Burt did her utmost to retain her title but was unable to better 23.97."

On 12 September 1965, Jack Sears driving a Bentley 8-litre set fastest time of the day by a Bentley.

David Good, BRM, set the track record of 22.78 sec on 28 May 1967, a record he holds in perpetuity, as the course closed at the end of the season.

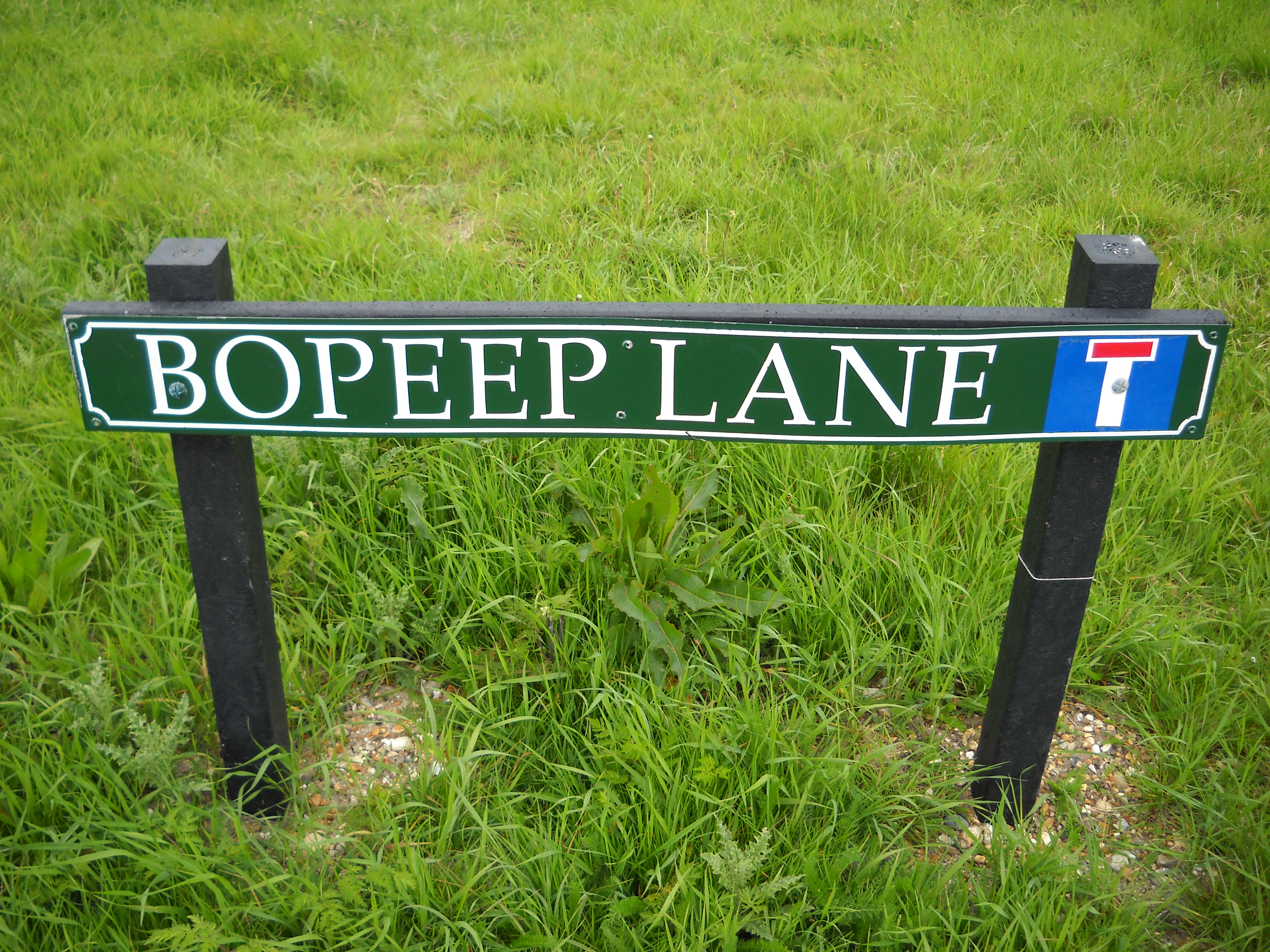
Road sign on approach to Firle Hill Climb.

== Firle Hill Climb events and past winners ==
Year	Driver	Vehicle	Time	Club	Notes
1949	F.H. Howorth	Lagonda 4 1/2-litre #57	31.40 sec R	Bentley D.C.	25 September.
1950	G.D. Parker	Jaguette 2 1/2-litre S/C	31.40 sec	Bentley D.C.	24 September; equalled course record.
1951	Gerry Crozier	Barnato-Hassan 8-litre	30.2 sec R	Bentley D.C.	30 September.
1952	Gerry Crozier	Bentley 8-litre	30.8 sec	Bentley D.C.	28 September. Joint fastest.
1952	D. Hely	Frazer-Nash LMR	30.8 sec	Bentley D.C.	28 September. Joint fastest.
1953	Ben Wyatt	Frazer-Nash 2-litre	30.91 sec	Bentley D.C.	27 September. Mist affected second runs.
1954	G. Parker	Jaguara S/C	28.46 sec	Bentley D.C.	5 September.
1955	G. Parker	Jaguara 3 1/2-litre S/C	26.98 sec R	Bentley D.C.	4 September.
1956	J. Rudd	Frazer-Nash LMR	29.63 sec	BARC	25 May.
1956	Max Trimble	Jaguar C-Type	28.67 sec	Bentley D.C.	2 September.
1957	G. Parker	Jaguara	26.73 sec R	BARC East Sussex/Bentley D.C.	2 June.
1957	M. Salmon	Jaguar C-Type	28.38 sec	Bentley D.C.	8 September.
1958	W.D.J. Roscoe	Cooper-JAP S/C	26.71 sec R	BARC	1 June.
1958	P.M. Salmon	Jaguar C-Type	27.48 sec	Bentley D.C.	7 September.
1958				BARC S.E.	5 Oct.
1959	Patsy Burt	Cooper	26.57 sec R	BARC	31 May.
1959	M.H. Barker	Alton-Jaguar	28.39 sec	Bentley D.C.	6 September.
1959	Patsy Burt	Cooper-Climax	25.40 sec R	BARC South Eastern	4 October.
1960				BARC South Eastern	29 May.
1960				M.G. Car Club (S.E.)	10 July.
1960	A.G. Mann	H.W.M.-Jaguar	27.36 sec	Bentley D.C.	4 September.
1960	M. Anthony	Lister-Corvette 5,555 c.c.	26.08 sec	BARC	2 October.
1961	Arthur Owen	Cooper	25.94 sec	BARC South Eastern	28 May.
1961	W.G. Heathcote	Lotus 18-Ford 1.0-litre	26.55 sec	M.G. Car Club (S.E.)	9 July.
1961	M.H. Barker	Alton-Jaguar	27.28 sec	Bentley D.C.	3 September.
1961	A. Owen	Cooper	25.21 sec R	BARC S.E./M.G. Car Club (S.E.)	1 October.
1962	A. Owen	Cooper	24.83 sec R	BARC	27 May. Wet morning, dry afternoon.
1962	W.G. Heathcote	Lotus 18-Ford 1.0-litre	25.40 sec	M.G. Car Club (S.E.)	8 July.
1962	C.R.C. Aston	Aston Martin DB3S 2,992 c.c.	26.09 sec	Bentley D.C./M.G. Car Club	16 September.
1962	D. Good	Cooper-Climax	27.68 sec	BARC S.E./M.G. Car Club (S.E.)	30 September. Wet and slippery.
1963	Patsy Burt	Cooper T59-Climax 2.0	24.45 sec R	BARC South Eastern	26 May.
1963	Gordon Parker	Cooper-Climax	25.06 sec	BARC S.E./M.G. Car Club (S.E.)	14 July.
1963	D.R. Good	Cooper-Daimler	24.53 sec	BARC S.E./M.G. Car Club (S.E.)	1 September.
1963	Peter Farquharson	Allard J2-Chrysler 5.4-litre	26.23 sec	Bentley D.C.	15 September.
1964	Gordon Parker	Cooper T43-Climax 1.5 S/C	23.87 sec R	BARC South Eastern	31 May.
1964	David Beckett	Lister-Jaguar 3.8-litre	27.89 sec	M.G. Car Club (S.E.)	12 July.
1964	David Beckett	Lister-Jaguar	25.45 sec	Bentley D.C.	13 September.
1964	J.F. Barnes	Elva Mk 7-Ford 1,500 c.c. S/C	24.41 sec	BARC South Eastern	4 October.
1965	Patsy Burt	Cooper T59-Climax 2.0	24.22 sec	BARC South Eastern	30 May.
1965	BARC South Eastern, 20 June, practice day.				
1965	Gordon Parker	Cooper-Climax	26.87 sec	M.G. Car Club (S.E.)	11 July, wet.
1965	Gordon Parker	Cooper Climax	23.09 sec	BARC S.E./M.G. Car Club (S.E.)	29 August.
1965	R. Tindell	Lister-Jaguar	25.88 sec	Bentley D.C.	12 September.
1966	John Barnes	Elva Mk 7-Ford 1,650 c.c. S/C	24.09 sec	BARC South Eastern	29 May.
1966	D. Harris	D.M.F. 3-Ford 1.6-litre	24.02 sec	M.G. Car Club (S.E.)/BARC	19 June.
1967	David Good	BRM P67 4wd 2.0-litre #170	22.78 sec R	BARC South Eastern	28 May.
1967	M.G. Car Club (S.E.), 25 June, rained off.				
1967	John Fenwick	Brabham BT18 Ford 1.6-litre	24.52 sec	BARC South Eastern	27 August.
1967	Mike Barker	Alton-Jaguar	25.71 sec	Bentley D.C.	17 September.

Key: R = Course Record; S/C = Supercharged.

== See also ==
- Brighton Speed Trials
- Goodwood Circuit
- Gurston Down Motorsport Hillclimb
- Lewes Speed Trials
