= Mark Colton =

Mark Colton (17 March 1961 – 5 August 1995) was a British racing driver and software author.

He was killed in practice for Craigantlet Hillclimb speed event in Northern Ireland after his Pilbeam hit a telegraph pole.

Colton's best year was 1994, when he was runner-up to David Grace.

Outside motorsport, Colton was an influential figure in the development of software for personal computers, particularly those made by Acorn Computers, being the author of the Acornsoft View range and View Professional for the BBC Micro while working at Protechnic in the early 1980s. View Professional was the predecessor of the PipeDream integrated suite for the Cambridge Z88 portable computer, Acorn Archimedes and IBM PC compatibles. Having founded Colton Software to market PipeDream, the company followed up with a range of applications - Wordz, Resultz and Recordz - comprising the Fireworkz suite, this being released for RISC OS and Microsoft Windows. In a tribute to Colton, Charles Moir, founder of Computer Concepts - the "chief rival" to Colton Software - called him "one of only a handful of people in this country who could and did develop decent, competitive, mainstream applications".
