= Harewood speed Hillclimb =

English hillclimb

Coordinates: 53°54′17.64″N 1°29′24.68″W

Harewood
- Location: Harewood, Yorkshire, England
- Time zone: GMT
- Opened: 1962
- Major Events: British Hill Climb Championship
- Hill Length: 1,584 yards (1,448 m)
- Hill Record: 46.39 (Matthew Ryder, 2022, British Hill Climb Championship)

Harewood speed Hillclimb (the form with italics and a lower-case s is used officially) is a hillclimb near the village of Harewood, West Yorkshire, England. The track can be found on the A659 between Harewood village and Collingham, north of Leeds. In addition to national events, it hosts rounds of the British Hill Climb Championship, a Classic & Historic Hillclimb and an event that includes bikes. Around 11 meetings are organised between April and September each year by the British Automobile Racing Club Yorkshire Centre.

The first event on the track took place on 16 September 1962, and Best Time of the Day was set at 51.61s by Tony Lanfranchi driving an Elva Mk VI. This was on the original 'Short Course'. The first R.A.C. Hill Climb Championship event was held in September, 1964. In the mid 1990s the track was extended to 1,584 yards (1,448 m). As of 2025, the outright hill record holder is Matt Ryder, whose time of 46.39 seconds was set on 3 July 2022 in that day's 2nd Top 12 Runoff.

== Harewood Hill Climb past winners ==
Year	Driver	Vehicle	Time	Notes
1963	Keith Schellenberg	Lister-Jaguar	49.79 sec	21 April.
1964	I.C. Batty	Lotus 7-Ford	50.746 sec	12 July. Novices Meeting.
1964	Peter Westbury	Ferguson-Climax 4-w-d	44.45 sec R	13 Sep.
1965	Peter Meldrum	Lotus 22-Allard Dragon		12 Sep.
1966	P.H. Meldrum	Lotus-Allard special	45.99 sec	11 Sep.
1967	Round 12 : Tony Marsh	Marsh-Buick Special 4,200 c.c.	42.94 sec R	10 Sep.
1972	R. Scott-Moncrieff	Kincraft-Chevrolet 5.0-litre	44.15 sec	23 July. Novices Meeting.
1976	Roy Lane	McRae GM1-Chevrolet 5.0-litre	38.77 sec	
2006	Round 17 : Scott Moran	Gould-NME GR61 3.5-litre	49.19 sec R	2 July.
2006	Round 18 : Martin Groves	Gould-NME GR55 3.5-litre	49.92 sec	2 July.
2010	Round 3 : Scott Moran	Gould-NME GR61X 3.5-litre	49.31 sec FTD	9 May.
2010	Round 4 : Martin Groves	Gould-NME GR55 3.5-litre	49.52 sec	9 May.

Key: R = Course Record.
