= British Hill Climb Championship =

British motorsports event

British Hillclimb Championship presented by Avon Tyres
- Category: Hillclimb
- Country: United Kingdom Guernsey Jersey
- Inaugural season: 1947
- Drivers' champion: (England) Matthew Ryder
- Official website: britishhillclimb.co.uk/

The British Hillclimb Championship (BHC) is the most prestigious hillclimbing championship in Great Britain. The British Hill Climb Championship was held every year from 1947 to 2019, and resumed in 2021. The 2020 season was cancelled due to the COVID-19 pandemic.

All British Champions have been British. The most successful driver in terms of individual victories is Scott Moran, with 163, followed by Martin Groves (104) and Roy Lane (91). Moran and Tony Marsh jointly hold the record for the most championships, with six apiece. Ken Wharton is the only driver to win four consecutive titles, while Marsh uniquely scored two hat-tricks in 1955-1957 and 1965–1967.

== Venues ==
The following tracks are used in the British Hill Climb Championship.

- Doune
- Gurston Down
- Harewood
- Loton Park
- Prescott
- Shelsley Walsh
- Wiscombe Park
- Bouley Bay
- Craigantlet
- Val des Terres

A number of other venues have featured in the championship over the years including Barbon, Bo'ness, Dyrham Park, Fintray, Great Auclum, Lhergy Frissel, Longleat, Pontypool Park, Rest and Be Thankful, Stapleford Aerodrome, Tholt-y-Will and Westbrook Hay.

== Format ==
A major hillclimb may have an entry of more than 150 drivers, but the event is usually a qualifying round of more than one competition, and some drivers (especially drivers of less powerful cars) will not be entered for the British Championship itself. Those who are, and who record a time in the top twelve of all those eligible, compete in a "run-off" at the end of each set of class run (there are two such sets of class runs at each event). In a run-off, drivers tackle the hill in reverse order of their qualifying times, although where two drivers share a car, the slower qualifier competes at the start of the run-off session. The person who sets the fastest time receives 10 British Championship points, the second-fastest driver nine, and so on down to the tenth-placed driver, who gets one. The 11th and 12th-placed drivers, and any who fail to complete the course, receive no points. An extra point is given to any driver in the run-off who breaks the outright hill record as it stood at the beginning of the day.

As of 2022 there are 30 runoffs, but drivers can only count their 24 best results towards their final points total. In 2004, Adam Fleetwood achieved the unprecedented feat of winning 28 out of 34 rounds, and so had to drop all his non-win points. Even so, he won the championship by a huge margin: before taking account of his dropped scores, he had racked up 318 points, with the runner-up, 1997 champion Roger Moran, a long way behind on 176 points.

== History ==
=== The early days ===
The first climb of the inaugural series was staged at Bo'ness, near Linlithgow, Scotland on 17 May 1947. It was one of five events in that year's championship, the other climbs being held at Bouley Bay, Craigantlet, Prescott and Shelsley Walsh. All but Bo'ness still host rounds of the BHC. The inaugural championship, as well as the 1948 title, went to Raymond Mays, who proved he was still the force to be reckoned with that he had been before World War II. Sydney Allard won the title in 1949 in the self-built Steyr-Allard.

=== The 1950s ===
Although the 1950 championship went to Alfa Romeo driver Dennis Poore, from then on every title of the decade was to be won by a driver who had spent most or all of the year behind the wheel of a Cooper with a JAP engine. Ken Wharton started the trend, and became the only man to win four successive BHC titles. In the mid-Fifties there were three successive titles for the near-legendary Tony Marsh, a man who would still be competing at the highest level of hillclimbing as the 20th century closed. And finally, another hat-trick of championships went to David Boshier-Jones.

The decade was also touched by tragedy, when Bill Sleeman was killed at Bouley Bay, Jersey in 1955.

The final round of the decade was held at Stapleford Aerodrome on 11 October 1959, an event won by David Good in a Cooper-J.A.P. 1,100 c.c.

=== The 1960s ===
Although the 1960s opened as the Fifties had ended, with Boshier-Jones taking the honours in his Cooper-JAP, the decade was to see a marked change in hillclimbing. One notable feature of 1960s climbing was the appearance of four-wheel drive, with several of the decade's championships being won by drivers in such cars, including two for Peter Westbury.

Mike Gray became the second driver to be killed at a BHC round when he died at Barbon in 1964.

=== The 1970s ===
The Seventies saw two notable firsts: Roy Lane's maiden championship in 1975, and the first of 18 titles in the space of 22 years for Pilbeam drivers when Alister Douglas-Osborn took the honours in 1977.

=== The 1980s ===
This decade also saw the first championship to be won by a Gould driver, when Chris Cramer took the title in 1985. However, it was to be the late 1990s before the Pilbeam near-stranglehold on the BHC would be broken for any length of time.

=== The 1990s ===
The 1990s continued and even intensified Pilbeam's dominance of the sport, with the first eight championships of the decade being won by a driver in one of the marque's cars. By the time Roger Moran clinched the title in 1997, Pilbeam drivers had won 18 of the 22 championships since 1977, a dominance rivalled only by the Cooper years of the 1950s and early 1960s.

However, change was afoot, and the 1998 championship went to a Gould driver, David Grace. The future CEO of Rockingham Motor Speedway stamped his authority on the championship with a hat-trick of titles as the 20th century closed. As of 2004, every champion since had been behind the wheel of a Gould.

The hillclimb world was shocked in 1995 by the death of one of its leading lights, when Mark Colton was killed in practice at Craigantlet. He thus became only the third driver to lose his life in the history of the BHC.

=== A new century ===
The start of the 21st century saw a "changing of the guard" in the BHC, as young drivers in lightweight cars made their presence felt at the highest level. Graeme Wight Jr dominated in 2001, and in June he broke the outright record at Shelsley Walsh that had stood for nine years. Almost a year later he became the first driver to break the 25-second barrier at the track, winning a prize of £1,000.

The 2001 season was severely disrupted by the foot and mouth crisis that year, which caused the postponement of some rounds of the series, though only one climb - at Barbon - was actually cancelled entirely, and co-operation between event organisers and local landowners meant that spectators continued to be admitted to the meetings, albeit with precautions such as the disinfecting of cars entering the car parks.

A little later in the decade, once Adam Fleetwood had proved that he could translate his exploits in smaller cars to the top class, Wight Jr began to come under intense pressure, and by 2004 Fleetwood usually had the better of their battles. That season's championship was robbed of a classic battle for the title when Wight Jr pulled out in June to wait for the arrival of a new car - this had still not been driven in anger by the end of the year. However, crowds around the country could console themselves by watching a true master of the hills at work. Fleetwood won all but six of the year's 34 BHC rounds, breaking hill records for fun - and in turn became the first person to climb Shelsley in under 24 seconds.

Fleetwood's announcement in April 2005 that other commitments would prevent his defending his title meant once again that the two most successful drivers of the 2000s would not go head-to-head, and the stage seemed set for Wight Jr to regain his crown, although his new V10 Predator proved unreliable, allowing the impressive Martin Groves to open up a lead at the top of the points table; Groves had the championship wrapped up by early August. With Wight Jr still nowhere to be seen, Groves retained the title in 2006, although he had to wait a month longer than in the previous year thanks to a spirited challenge from Scott Moran. Groves again held off Moran's charge in 2007 to complete a hat-trick of titles, but in 2008 Moran took his first championship win, retaining his title in 2009.

Moran has since won a further five titles, and his Gould GR61X (by far the most successful car in the history of the championship, with over 170 run-off wins) has won a total of seven. After several seasons in a supercharged Suzuki Hayabusa-engined DJ Firehawk, Alex Summers co-drove the GR61X with Moran and became champion in it at his first attempt.

Pirelli developed a new tyre for British hillclimbing in 2019, giving Avon its first rival in the 21st century. This forced Avon to respond by introducing its new Hillclimb GT Super Soft Compound tyre on 4 June 2020. Several drivers made the switch, including that year's Champion Wallace Menzies. Driving a Gould GR59 with a 3.3-litre V8 engine derived from the Cosworth XD, Menzies made it mathematically impossible for anyone to catch him after Round 27 (of 34) at Gurston Down on 25 August 2019. He became only the second Scottish driver to win the title after Graeme Wight Jr.

Since 1998, the only non-Gould driver to win the championship has been Trevor Willis, who did so in 2012 with his OMS 25, a less powerful but lighter car with a V8 engine derived from two Hayabusa units, and again in 2017 and 2018 with a similar but updated OMS 28.

=== 2020 cancellation ===
Restrictions brought into force during the COVID-19 pandemic made it impossible to run events in the early part of 2020. Attempts were then made to organise a 'foreshortened' championship with rounds at five venues held over seven weekends starting in August. On 12 June, however, the Bugatti Owners' Club announced that, while it intended to reintroduce events at Prescott, it would not host a British championship event that season. This prompted the cancellation of the 2020 championship and an announcement that the organisers would now focus on the 2021 season.

== 2021 season ==
The 2021 British Hillclimb Championship presented by Avon Tyres was won by 2019 (and reigning) Champion Wallace Menzies.

== Champions ==
Year	Champion	Car
2026	Matthew Ryder	Gould GR59M
2025	Matthew Ryder	Gould GR59M
2024	Matthew Ryder	Gould GR59M
2023	Wallace Menzies	Gould GR59M
2022	Wallace Menzies	Gould GR59M
2021	Wallace Menzies	Gould GR59M
2020	None	None
2019	Wallace Menzies	Gould GR59M
2018	Trevor Willis	OMS 28 RPE
2017	Trevor Willis	OMS 28 RPE
2016	Scott Moran	Gould GR61X NME
2015	Alex Summers	Gould GR61X NME
2014	Scott Moran	Gould GR61X NME
2013	Scott Moran	Gould GR61X NME
2012	Trevor Willis	OMS 25 Powertec
2011	Scott Moran	Gould GR61X NME
2010	Martin Groves	Gould GR55B NME
2009	Scott Moran	Gould GR61X NME
2008	Scott Moran	Gould GR61X NME
2007	Martin Groves	Gould GR55B NME
2006	Martin Groves	Gould GR55B NME
2005	Martin Groves	Gould GR55B NME
2004	Adam Fleetwood	Gould GR55 NME
2003	Adam Fleetwood	Gould GR55 NME
2002	Graeme Wight Jr	Gould GR51
2001	Graeme Wight Jr	Gould GR51
2000	David Grace	Gould Ralt GR37
1999	David Grace	Gould Ralt GR37
1998	David Grace	Gould Ralt GR37
1997	Roger Moran	Pilbeam MP72
1996	Roy Lane	Pilbeam MP58-09
1995	Andy Priaulx	Pilbeam MP58-03
1994	David Grace	Pilbeam MP58-05
1993	David Grace	Pilbeam MP58-05
1992	Roy Lane	Pilbeam MP58-08
1991	Martyn Griffiths	Pilbeam MP58-05
1990	Martyn Griffiths	Pilbeam MP58-05
1989	Ray Rowan	Roman-Hart IVH
1988	Charles Wardle	Pilbeam-Repco MP47
1987	Martyn Griffiths	Pilbeam-Hart MP53
1986	Martyn Griffiths	Pilbeam-Hart MP53
1985	Chris Cramer	Gould-Hart 84/2
1984	Martin Bolsover	Pilbeam-Hart MP43
1983	Martin Bolsover	Pilbeam-Hart MP50
1982	Martin Bolsover	Pilbeam-Hart MP50
1981	James Thomson	Pilbeam-Hart MP40
1980	Chris Cramer	March-Hart
1979	Martyn Griffiths	Pilbeam-Hart MP40
1978	David Franklin	March-BMW
1977	Alister Douglas-Osborn	Pilbeam-DFV R22
1976	Roy Lane	McRae-Chevrolet GM1
1975	Roy Lane	McRae-Chevrolet GM1
1974	Mike MacDowel	Brabham-Repco BT36X
1973	Mike MacDowel	Brabham-Repco BT36X
1972	Sir Nicholas Williamson, Bt	March-Hart
1971	David Hepworth	Hepworth-Chevrolet 4WD
1970	Sir Nicholas Williamson, Bt	McLaren-Chevrolet M10A
1969	David Hepworth	Hepworth-Oldsmobile 4WD
1968	Peter Lawson	BRM P67 4WD
1967	Tony Marsh	Marsh-GM
1966	Tony Marsh	Marsh-GM
1965	Tony Marsh	Marsh-GM
1964	Peter Westbury	Ferguson-Climax P99 4WD
1963	Peter Westbury	Felday-Daimler / Cooper-Daimler
1962	Arthur Owen	Cooper-Climax T53
1961	David Good	Cooper-JAP Mk 8
1960	David Boshier-Jones	Cooper-JAP Mk 9
1959	David Boshier-Jones	Cooper-JAP Mk 9
1958	David Boshier-Jones	Cooper-JAP Mk 9
1957	Tony Marsh	Cooper-JAP Mk 8
1956	Tony Marsh	Cooper-JAP Mk 8
1955	Tony Marsh	Cooper-JAP Mk 8
1954	Ken Wharton	Cooper-JAP Mk 4 / ERA R4D
1953	Ken Wharton	Cooper-JAP Mk 4 / ERA R11B
1952	Ken Wharton	Cooper-JAP Mk 4 / ERA R11B
1951	Ken Wharton	Cooper-JAP Mk 4
1950	Dennis Poore	Alfa Romeo 8C-35
1949	Sydney Allard	Steyr-Allard
1948	Raymond Mays	ERA R4D
1947	Raymond Mays	ERA R4D
