= Great Auclum National Speed Hill Climb =

Motorcar course in Burghfield Common, Berkshire, England

Great Auclum National Speed Hill Climb was a motorcar course close to Burghfield Common in the English county of Berkshire.

It was based in the grounds of a large country house, formerly owned by a family connected to Huntley and Palmer – the famous biscuit manufacturers at nearby Reading, Berkshire. The hill climb was organised by the Hants and Berks Motor Club as a National Speed Hill Climb. This was part of the RAC British Hill Climb Championship, and at 440 yards (400 m) long it was the shortest of events in the Championship. The course travelled nearly as far downhill as it did up, with a finish almost level with the start. Motor Sport reported : "The ¼-mile course embraces two sharp corners, one banked, and a twisty section, so that a premium is set on initial acceleration and low-speed cornering."

== Early days ==
Prior to World War Two at least one event took place at Burghfield, as the event was then known. In 1939 Motor Sport listed a forthcoming event: 27 May 1939, Sporting O.D.C. Speed event, Burghfield, which was cancelled. An event took place in June organised by the Frazer-Nash and Frazer-Nash B.M.W. C.C. and Sporting O.D.C. "The postponed speed hill-climb up the private drive of Neil Gardner's (sic) house at Burghfield Common happened on 24 June, complete with adjacent funfair and Lord Nuffield to present the prizes." P.W. Neale set fastest time of the day in 27.0 secs "winning the 2-litre class from Fane's B.M.W."

Racing resumed in 1947 when: "Salvadori's monoposto Alfa-Romeo won its class in 25.2 sec., but couldn't be extended, and it was L.J.D. Bartlett's home-brewed Mercury Special which made f.t.d. in 23.5 sec." The following year Ken Wharton's Wharton Special "beautifully crisp and fearlessly handled, made f.t.d. in 23.34 sec., beating Stirling Moss (23.46 sec.), who drove absolutely superbly getting into third gear in his Cooper 500,..."

== The end ==
The last event was held in 1974 and the site has now been re-developed for housing. However the course itself is still there as it was the rear drive to Great Auclum house, which has now been redeveloped. The track is in a poor state of repair and very overgrown.

== Great Auclum Hill Climb past winners ==
Year	Driver	Vehicle	Time	Notes
1939	P.W. Neale	A.C.N. Special 1,991 c.c.	27.0 sec	24 June.
1947	L.J.D. Bartlett	Mercury Special	23.5 sec	26 July.
1948	Ken Wharton	Wharton-Special	23.34 sec	25 July.
1949	Eric Brandon	Cooper-J.A.P. 994 c.c.	22.20 sec	14 Aug.
1950	A.J. Butterworth	A.J.B.	23.50 sec	23 July.
1951	D.N. Brake	Cooper 996 c.c.	22.39 sec	28 July.
1952	Cancelled due to cattle "foot and mouth" disease.			
1953	Stuart Lewis-Evans	Cooper 1,100 c.c. s/c	21.47 sec R	8 Aug.
1954	Michael Burn	Frazer-Nash	24.54 sec	7 Aug; Wet & dry.
1955	Tony Marsh	Cooper 1,100 c.c.	R	6 Aug.
1956	Tony Marsh	Cooper 1,100 c.c.	20.6 sec	4 Aug.
1957	Tommy Sopwith	Cooper-Climax 1,500 c.c. sports	21.76 sec	
1958	R.B. James	Cooper-Norton 500 c.c.	22.19 sec	
1959	D. Boshier-Jones	Cooper 1,100 c.c.	20.56 sec R	8 Aug.
1960	D. Boshier-Jones	Cooper 1,100 c.c. V-twin	20.49 sec R	6 Aug.
1961	Peter Boshier-Jones	Lola-Climax	21.57 sec	12 Aug.
1962	Tico Martini	Martini-Special Triumph 650 c.c.	20.14 sec R	11 Aug.
1963	Peter Boshier-Jones	Lotus 22-Climax 1.3-litre s/c	19.75 sec R	10 Aug.
1964	Peter Boshier-Jones	Lotus 22-Climax 1.3-litre s/c		8 Aug.
1965	Peter Boshier-Jones	Lotus 22-Climax 1.3-litre s/c	19.099 sec R	7 Aug.
1966	Peter Meldrum	Lotus-Allard 1,650 c.c.	22.14 sec	6 Aug. Rain led to abandonment.
1967	Mike Hawley	Brabham BT23B-Climax 2.0-litre	19.38 sec	5 Aug.
1968				
1969	Roy Lane	Tech-Craft Buick 3.5-litre	18.58 sec	2 Aug.
1970	David Good	McLaren M10B		1 Aug.
1971	Sir Nick Williamson	Brabham F2 FVC	18.36 sec R	31 July.
1972	Tony Griffiths			
1973	Chris Cramer	March-Hart BDA 2-litre	17.65 sec R	
1974	Roy Lane	McRae F5000	17.97	10.08.1974

Key: R = Course Record.

== Course ==
Point	Coordinates (Links to map resources)	OS Grid Ref	Notes
Start	51.398724°N 1.051641°W	SU66076705	
Turn 1	51.397512°N 1.051694°W	SU66066692	
Turn 2	51.396957°N 1.053046°W	SU65976686	
Turn 3	51.396809°N 1.053389°W	SU65956684	
Turn 4	51.396454°N 1.053518°W	SU65946680	
Finish 1 440 yds	51.396401°N 1.053947°W	SU65916679	
Finish 2 500 yds	51.396388°N 1.054677°W	SU65866679	

== See also ==
- Lewes Speed Trials
- Westbrook Hay Hill Climb
