= Gurston Down Motorsport Hillclimb =

Coordinates: 51°2′2.12″N 1°58′8.75″W

Gurston Down Speed Hill Climb
- Location: Broad Chalke, Wiltshire, England
- Time zone: GMT
- Coordinates: W1:58:02, N51:01:55
- Major Events: British Hill Climb Championship
- Hill Length: 1,058 yards (967 m)
- Hill Record: 25.00 (Alex Summers, 2022, British Hill Climb Championship)

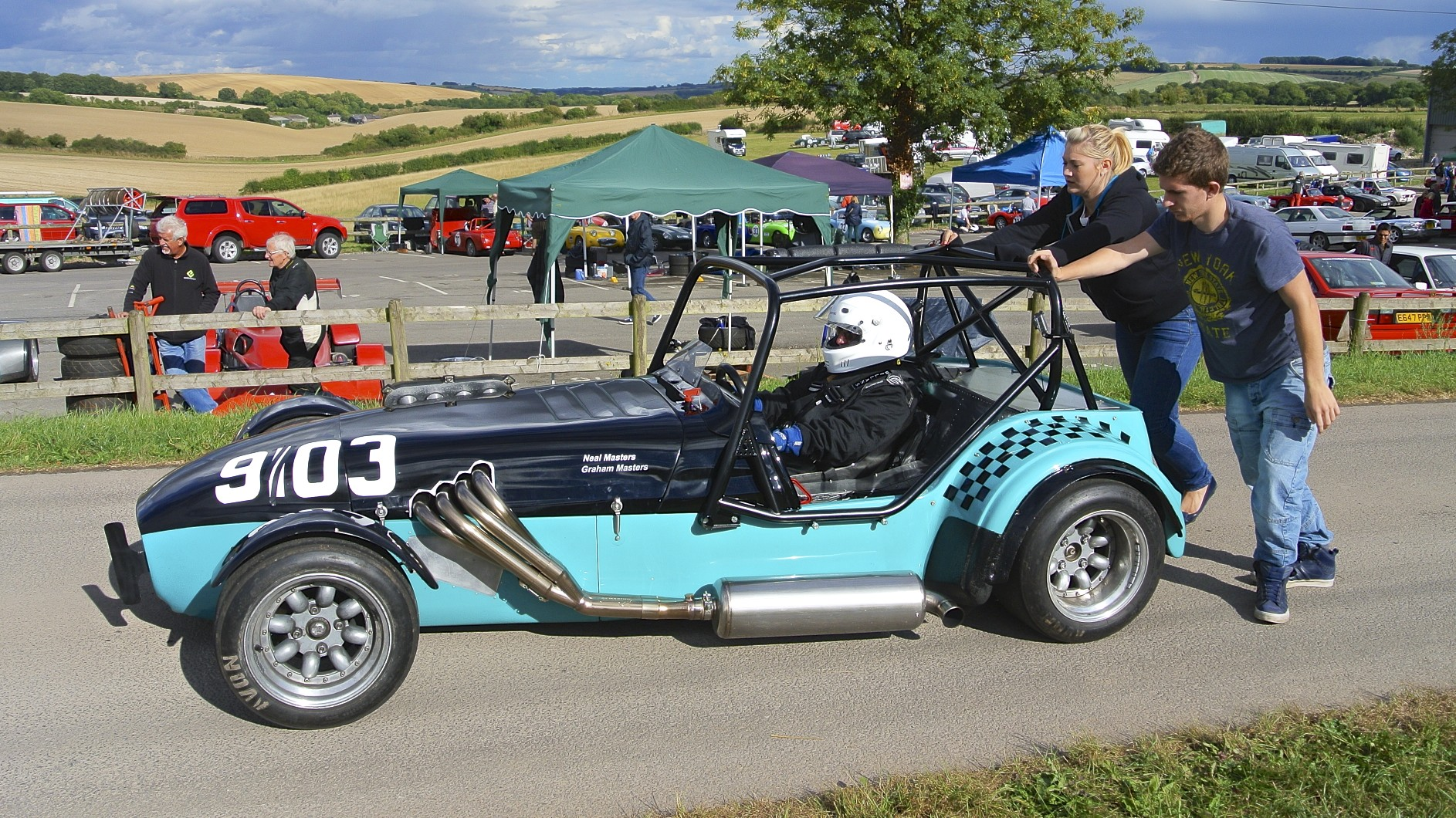

Gurston Down Speed Hill Climb is a hillclimb in Broad Chalke, Wiltshire, England, organised by the South Western Centre of the British Automobile Racing Club. The first practice meeting was held on 25 June 1967, when Patsy Burt, driving a McLaren-Oldsmobile set a time of 39.90 sec. The first competition event was held on 23 July 1967.

The track currently hosts eight competitive events each year; two, two-day events, and five are single-day events. In addition, a Test Day is held annually just before the competitive season starts. The venue also conducts four Hill Climb School days each year, which follow the syllabus set by AHASS (the Association of Hill Climb and Sprint Schools).

The venue currently hosts two rounds a year of the British Hill Climb Championship during May and August and seven events of its own championship. The 2020 Hill and Championship Sponsor is Turbo Dynamics, a company owned and run by Peter Marsh, son of the hill's designer, Tony Marsh. In addition to the Turbo Dynamics Championship, the venue hosts rounds of the ASWMC, ACSMC and HSA championships and a number of other national championships.

Motorcycles also visit the venue five times a year, and run as part of five of the single-day events. The motorcycle riders are members of the National Hill Climb Association (NHCA).

The farmland the course traverses is also used for pheasant shoots and the course itself has found a dual use as a gravity racing venue.

The course measures 1058 yards (967 metres), and rises a total of 140 feet (43 metres), although the first section of the track is downhill, a feature unique in British hill climbing, but not unknown elsewhere in Europe.

The course was designed in 1965 by Tony Marsh, who was still competing the course in the premier over 2000cc racing car class in 2007. In July 2009, the third round of the Gurston Down Speed Hill Climb Championships was dedicated to Marsh's memory following his death in May.

The outright hill record is held by Alex Summers, who completed the course in 25.00 seconds on 29 May 2022, driving a DJ Firestorm.

== Gurston Down Hill Climb past winners ==
Year	Driver	Vehicle	Time	Notes
1971	D. Hepworth	Hepworth FF	35.06 sec	30 August
1972	Mike MacDowel	Brabham BT36X-Repco 5 litre	30.94 sec	
1973	Mike MacDowel	Brabham BT36X-Repco 5-litre	30.50 sec R	
1991	Round 5 : Martyn Griffiths	Pilbeam DFR	27.64 sec R	
2005	Round 9 : Martin Groves	Gould-NME GR55B 3.5-litre	26.57 sec	29 May
2005	Round 10 : Martin Groves	Gould-NME GR55B 3.5-litre	26.27 sec	29 May
2008	Round 7 : Trevor Willis		31.05 sec	25 May
2008	Round 8 : Martin Groves	Gould	26.50 sec	25 May
2008	Round 27 : Martin Groves	Gould	27.41 sec	24 August
2008	Round 28 : Jos Goodyear		26.47 sec	24 August

Key: R = Course Record.

== See also ==
- Firle Hill Climb
- Great Auclum National Speed Hill Climb
