= Mike MacDowel =

British racing driver (1932–2016)

- Born: 13 September 1932; Great Yarmouth, Norfolk, England
- Died: 19 January 2016 (aged 83); Cheltenham, England

Formula One World Championship career
- Nationality: (United Kingdom) British
- Active years: 1957
- Team: Cooper
- Entries: 1
- Championships: 0
- Wins: 0
- Podiums: 0
- Career points: 0
- Pole positions: 0
- Fastest laps: 0
- First entry: 1957 French Grand Prix

Michael George Hartwell MacDowel (13 September 1932 – 19 January 2016) was an English racing driver who participated in one Formula One World Championship Grand Prix, the 1957 French Grand Prix on 7 July 1957, sharing his car with Jack Brabham. MacDowel did not score any championship points as he finished seventh (having qualified 15th and last), and points were only awarded to the first five finishers.

MacDowel was a keen amateur racer. After a break, he competed in hill climb events from 1968 until well after his 60th birthday. He set what was then the course record at Shelsley Walsh in 1973 (28.21 seconds for the 1000 yard course); further in both that season and the following year, he won the British Hill Climb Championship.

MacDowel died on 19 January 2016.

== Racing record ==
=== Complete Formula One World Championship results ===
(key)

Year	Entrant	Chassis	Engine	1	2	3	4	5	6	7	8	WDC	Points
1957	Cooper Car Company	Cooper T43	Climax Straight-4	ARG	MON	500	FRA; 7*	GBR	GER	PES	ITA	NC	0

* Indicates shared drive with Jack Brabham

=== Complete British Saloon Car Championship results ===
(key) (Races in bold indicate pole position; races in italics indicate fastest lap.)

Year	Team	Car	Class	1	2	3	4	5	6	7	8	9	10	11	DC	Pts	Class
1961	John Coombs Racing	Jaguar Mk II 3.8	D	SNE	GOO	AIN	SIL	CRY	SIL; DNS	BRH	OUL	SNE			NC	0	NC
1963	John Coombs Racing	Jaguar Mk II 3.8	D	SNE	OUL	GOO	AIN	SIL	CRY	SIL; 3	BRH	BRH	OUL	SIL	36th	4	15th

Sporting positions
Preceded by Nicholas Williamson	British Hill Climb Champion; 1973–1974	Succeeded by Roy Lane
