= Graeme Wight Jr. =

Scottish hillclimb driver (born 1970)

Graeme Wight Jr. (born c. 1970) is a Scottish racing driver, best known for his success in hillclimbing, where he has won two British championships.

Wight began competing in hillclimbs at an early age, but in September 1992, still only 21, he was badly injured in a road accident when the brakes failed on his Hillman Imp. It was feared that he might be paralysed, and he remained in hospital for more than two months, but by 1993 he was not only out of hospital, but competing in – and winning his class in – hillclimbs once again.

After a time in a Vision sports car in 1997 Wight won the Scottish Hillclimb Championship outright driving a Pilbeam. 1998 saw his first year of competition in the British Championship, at first in the two-litre class but then in the unlimited-capacity division. In 2000, now driving a Gould, he broke the hill record at Doune by 1.49 seconds, an astonishing margin in hillclimbing and indeed the biggest improvement in an outright record in BHCC history. After finishing fourth in the Championship that year, he finally reached the top in 2001 and 2002, winning the title in both years. Wight became the first driver to complete the course at Shelsley Walsh in under 25 seconds when he recorded a time of 24.85 seconds on Sunday 2 June 2002, in the presence of Sir Stirling Moss. In that same year, he became the first reigning British Hill Climb Champion to be invited to drive at the Goodwood Festival of Speed where he holds one of the fastest times recorded.

He was runner-up to Adam Fleetwood in 2003, but after that, things started to go wrong for Wight. He was Fleetwood's main rival in the first part of the 2004 season, but delays in the appearance of his new car meant that he barely competed after mid-June and could manage only eighth place in the championship. Continued development problems in 2005 meant that he was never in the running in that season's championship and only rarely qualified for the run-offs. He was also absent from the 2006 championship.

This new car was christened the "GWR Predator" and was of an entirely new bespoke design, representing a huge leap in the level of technology employed, with its combination of its light weight, innovation and complexity. The concept of the car was to employ an ex-Arrows F1 Cosworth V10 as the powerplant, using the engine's inherent light-weight and power to allow even further increases of power-to-weight ratio. In October 2006, however, Wight announced that the V10 engine was to be sold as he had grown frustrated of being unable to compete due to continual engine problems. He decided instead to power the car with the ex-DTM 2.5 V6 Opel Cosworth, previously used in his Gould GR51, though in the event the V10 was used.

Wight had a disappointing 2007, but in late 2008, at Doune, he won the first run-off and came second in the other run-off using the Predator. Wight was thrilled with his victory, saying that "the car has never been that good before" and that it had been "amazing" through the Esses.

His father, also named Graeme Wight and sometimes known as Graeme Wight Sr. to distinguish him from his son, also competed in hillclimbs, often sharing a car with his son.

For 2009, Wight stated his intention to compete with an electrically powered machine, designed in partnership with ex-Lotus F1 designer Martin Ogilvie and Cambridge University. The car is part of the Bee 4 Motorsport project.

This project did not last long enough for the car to be built. Wight's main business now is building the GWR Raptor single-seaters (also designed by Ogilvie) which have won many individual events though not yet the British Championship. All Raptors so far have been powered by supercharged or naturally-aspirated Suzuki Hayabusa engines with the exception of Midland Champion Robert Kenrick's BMW S1000RR-engined car, which has broken many records in the 601-1100cc class.

Wight competes only occasionally nowadays, but in June 2018 he set the fastest ever time for a 1600cc car (36.01 seconds) at Doune in Les Mutch's Raptor. This did not count as a class record because it was set during one of the Championship Run-Offs.

In 2024, Wight's eldest daughter, Caitlin, won the GWR Golden Apple award for her commendable team effort in the paddock.

== Notes ==
Sporting positions
Preceded by David Grace	British Hill Climb Champion; 2001-2002	Succeeded by Adam Fleetwood
