= Roy Lane =

British racing driver

Roy Lane (c. 1935 – 14 October 2009) was a British racing driver. He is best known for his great success in hillclimbing, having won the British Hillclimb Championship on four occasions (1975, 1976, 1992, and 1996) in a career spanning more than three decades. Lane won 90 individual rounds of the championship, a record equaled by Martin Groves in July 2009.

Lane still holds the course record at Curborough sprint track; 26.84 secs in his Pilbeam MP58-09 4 litre DFL since 21 April 1996, where he was almost invincible. In the 1990s, his partnership with the Pilbeam constructor was one of the most successful in the sport.

The back problems which troubled Lane for many years kept his appearances to a minimum in later seasons, although he still competed on occasion, and continued to be competitive in sprinting. He made a full return to hillclimbing in 2006, at the wheel of a Porsche 911.

Lane was formerly chief instructor at the Prescott Hillclimb Drivers School.

Roy Lane died of peritonitis on 14 October 2009.

Sporting positions
| Preceded by Mike MacDowel | British Hill Climb Champion; 1975-1976 | Succeeded by Alister Douglas-Osborn |
| Preceded by David Render | British Sprint Champion; 1984 | Succeeded by Ray Rowan |
| Preceded by Martyn Griffiths | British Hill Climb Champion; 1992 | Succeeded by David Grace |
| Preceded by Andy Priaulx | British Hill Climb Champion; 1996 | Succeeded by Roger Moran |
