= Roger Moran =

British hillclimb driver

Roger Moran is a British hillclimb driver, who won the British Hillclimb Championship in 1997. In recent years he has shared a car with his son Scott.

Sporting positions
Preceded by Roy Lane	British Hill Climb Champion; 1997	Succeeded by David Grace
