= Craigantlet Hillclimb =

Motorsport venue in Craigantlet, Northern Ireland

Coordinates: 54.616°N 5.788°W

Craigantlet
- Location: Craigantlet, Northern Ireland
- Time zone: GMT
- Major Events: British Hill Climb Championship
- Hill Length: 1,460 yards (1,340 m)
- Hill Record: 39.12 (Scott Moran (2012), Dave Uren (2019), 2012, 2019, British Hill Climb Championship)

Craigantlet Hillclimb, a speed event organised by the Ulster Automobile Club, was first held in 1913. It is the only such venue in Northern Ireland to host a round (latterly two rounds) of the British Hill Climb Championship, which started in 1947.

The current course is 1,460 yards (1335 metres) in length, and unlike hillclimbs in the rest of the UK is laid out on closed public roads. Sections of the course are named for past winners, in order of ascent: Howe, Hall, Hadley, Mays Cross, Allard, Wharton Straight, Pringle.

Tragedy struck at Craigantlet in 1995 when Mark Colton was killed in practice for the event. The meeting was abandoned.

The hill record currently stands at 39.63 seconds, set by Scott Moran on 2 August 2008, driving a Gould GR61.

== Craigantlet Hillclimb past winners ==
Year	Driver	Vehicle	Time	Notes
1913	Harry Ferguson	Vauxhall 25 h.p.	103 sec	1 1/8 miles (1.8 km) course.
1925	G. C. Cathie	Star	106.2 sec	
1929	Earl Howe	Mercedes	98.8 sec	
1930	Earl Howe	Mercedes	98.4 sec	1 1/8 miles (1.8 km) course.
1931	R.G.J. Nash	Frazer Nash 1 1/2 litre s/c	89.2 sec R	
1932	W. Sullivan	Lea-Francis	95.8 sec	
1933	E.D. Hall	M.G. Magnette 1,086 c.c. s/c	86.6 sec R	26 Aug.
1934	Eddie Hall	M.G. K3	87.4 sec	
1935	Eddie Hall	M.G. Magnette	83.2 sec	31 Aug.
1936	H.L. Hadley	Austin 747 c.c. sidevalve	82.2 sec	
1937	H.L. Hadley	Austin Seven	82.4 sec	
1938	Bert Hadley	Austin Seven	83.0 sec	27 Aug.
1939	Cancelled.			
1946	K.W. Bear	Bugatti 3-litre	85.6 sec	31 Aug; Wet.
1947	Sydney Allard	Steyr-Allard	87.0 sec	30 Aug; Hot.
1948	Raymond Mays	E.R.A.	75.8 sec	28 Aug; Course shortened 50 yards.
1949	Sydney Allard	Steyr-Allard	73.4 sec	
1950	Sydney Allard	Steyr-Allard	75.0 sec	
1951	Sydney Allard	Steyr-Allard	73.0 sec R	11 Aug; 1,833 yards.
1952	Ken Wharton	Cooper 1,000 s/c	80.2 sec	
1953	Ken Wharton	Cooper s/c	70.6 sec R	8 Aug; 1,833 yards; Sunny.
1954	Ken Wharton	E.R.A R4D	70.11 sec R	
1955	Ken Wharton	E.R.A. s/c	70.3 sec	6 Aug.
1956	Malcolm Templeton	Lotus-Climax 1,098 c.c.	87.13 sec	18 Aug; 1,833 yards.
1957	Dick Henderson	Cooper-J.A.P.	69.26 sec	
1958	David Boshier-Jones	Cooper-J.A.P.	69.99 sec	
1959	David Boshier-Jones	Cooper-J.A.P.	68.74 sec	
1960	Arthur Owen	Cooper	72.41 sec	13 Aug.
1961	John Pringle	Cooper-Climax 2,495 c.c.	67.24 sec R	19 Aug, dull but dry.
1962	John Pringle	Cooper-Climax	65.97 sec R	18 Aug.
1963	Peter Westbury	Felday-Daimler s/c		
1964	Peter Westbury	Ferguson P99 4-W-D	61.70 sec	15 Aug.
1965	Peter Meldrum	Lotus 20-Allard s/c	62.52 sec	14 Aug.
1966				13 Aug.
1967	Bryan Eccles	Brabham-Oldsmobile		12 Aug.
1968	Peter Lawson		57.98 sec	10 Aug.
1969	Martin Brain	Cooper T86B-BRM 3-litre	60.78 sec	9 Aug.
1970	Brian Nelson	Crosslé F2-FVA	R	
1971	Brian Nelson			15 Aug.
1972	Brian Nelson	Crosslé 22F-Hart	55.72 sec R	
1973	Nelson Todd	Crosslé 22F-Hart	57.50 sec	
1974	Tommy Reid	Brabham BT38		
1975	Patsy McGarrity	Chevron		
1976	Patsy McGarrity	Chevron B29 (Formula Atlantic)	55.34 sec R	
1977	Alister Douglas-Osborn	Pilbeam P2 DFV	51.64 sec R	
1978	Alister Douglas-Osborn	Pilbeam MP31/002 3-litre	54.62 sec	
1979				3-4 Aug.
1980	Round 11 : Chris Cramer	March 782 2.5-litre	51.03 sec R	2 Aug.
1981	Round 11 : James Thomson	Pilbeam MP40K	50.39 sec R	2 Aug.
1986	Round 11 : Martyn Griffiths	Pilbeam MP53/04-Hart 2.8-litre	50.14 sec	2 Aug.
1988	Round 13 : Martyn Griffiths	Pilbeam MP53 2.8-litre	49.65 sec R	6 Aug.
1989	Round 12 : Ray Rowan	Roman-Hart 2.8-litre	50.58 sec	5 Aug.
2005	Round 25 : Willem Toet	Pilbeam MP88 Judd 4.0-litre	40.36 sec FTD	6 Aug.
2005	Round 26 : Roger Moran	Gould-NME GR61X 3.5-litre	41.14 sec	6 Aug.
2008	Round 23 : Scott Moran	Gould GR61	40.57 sec	2 Aug.
2008	Round 24 : Scott Moran	Gould GR61	39.63 sec R	2 Aug.
2009	Round 25 : Scott Moran	Gould-NME GR61X 3.5-litre	40.95 sec	1 Aug.
2009	Round 26 : Trevor Willis	OMS CF06 Powertec 2.8-litre	40.99 sec	1 Aug.
2010				7 Aug.

Key: R = Course Record; FTD = Fastest Time of the Day.
