= Arthur Owen (racing driver) =

British racing driver (1915–2002)

- Born: 23 March 1915; Lambeth, London, England
- Died: 27 April 2002 (aged 87); Vilamoura, Algarve, Portugal

Formula One World Championship career
- Nationality: (United Kingdom) British
- Active years: 1960
- Team: privateer Cooper
- Entries: 1
- Championships: 0
- Wins: 0
- Podiums: 0
- Career points: 0
- Pole positions: 0
- Fastest laps: 0
- First entry: 1960 Italian Grand Prix

Arthur William Owen (23 March 1915 – 27 April 2002) was a British racing driver from England. He participated in one Formula One World Championship Grand Prix, the 1960 Italian Grand Prix, driving a privately entered 2.2-litre Cooper. He crashed on the first lap of the race at the South Corner, due to brake failure. He retired with suspension damage and scored no championship points.

On 17 October 1955 Arthur Owen, Jim Russell and William Knight drove a 'bobtail' Cooper sports car at the Autodrome de Montlhéry to set thirteen international speed and distance records in Class G on this banked track. Owen went on to set further records at Monza in Italy.

On 5 September 1959, driving a Cooper-Climax, Owen made fastest time of the day at the Brighton Speed Trials. In 1962, Owen won the British Hill Climb Championship at the wheel of a Cooper-Climax T53, prepared by fellow-competitor Patsy Burt's PMB Garages team. Owen competed in the 1962 Macau Grand Prix in a Cooper single-seater, qualifying on pole position but crashing early in the race. He finished third in the first Japanese Grand Prix, held at Suzuka on 3 and 4 May 1963, driving a Lotus 23 sports car.

== Complete Formula One World Championship results ==
(key)

Year	Entrant	Chassis	Engine	1	2	3	4	5	6	7	8	9	10	WDC	Points
1960	Arthur Owen	Cooper T45	Climax Straight-4	ARG	MON	500	NED	BEL	FRA	GBR	POR	ITA; Ret	USA	NC	0

== Books ==
- The Racing Coopers, by Arthur Owen, Cassell, 1959, 243 Pages.

Sporting positions
Preceded by David Good	British Hill Climb Champion; 1962	Succeeded by Peter Westbury
