= David Grace (racing driver) =

British racing driver and businessman (born 1949)

David Grace (born 1949 in Rugby, Warwickshire, England) is a British racing driver and businessman. He was the CEO at Rockingham Motor Speedway between 2000 and 2002, and oversaw the opening of the track and the return, after many years, of CART racing to Britain.

As a driver his greatest successes came in hillclimbing, where he was five times British Hillclimb Champion (1993-94-98-99-2000), an achievement placing him level with Martyn Griffiths and behind only six-times champion Tony Marsh. After joining Rockingham he ceased to climb regularly, but made occasional appearances in circuit racing. Grace made a brief return to hillclimbing in 2003 after leaving Rockingham.

Outside motorsport Grace has a career in business management.

Sporting positions
Preceded by Roy Lane	British Hill Climb Champion; 1993-1994	Succeeded by Andy Priaulx
Preceded by Roger Moran	British Hill Climb Champion; 1998-2000	Succeeded by Graeme Wight Jr.
