= David Good (driver) =

British racing driver (1933–2017)

David Good (1933 – 29 January 2017) is a former British Hill Climb Champion. In 1961 he won the qualifying rounds at Westbrook Hay and Wiscombe Park, driving a Cooper-JAP Mk 8, and clinched the title with a third place at Prescott in September. He finished third in the Championship in 1957 and 1958, being runner-up in 1959, winning the final round at Stapleford.

"Good started off with the ex-Dick Seaman, ex-Billy Cotton E.R.A., winning the E.R.A. trophy and gaining the class record at Great Auclum, not an easy course."

He returned in 1962 with a Cooper Formula Junior fitted with a JAP-engine, switched to a 1,475 c.c. Coventry-Climax engine, added a supercharger, then debuting the car at Wiscombe Park in 1963 fitted with a Daimler V8 engine, finishing the year in fifth place overall.

In 1964 Good appeared at hillclimb events driving George Keylock's Lotus Elan, winning his class at Loton Park.

Good led the 1967 British Hill Climb Championship at the half-way point in the four-wheel-drive B.R.M. ex-Grand Prix car. His challenge faded in the second half and the car was acquired by Peter Lawson, but not before David Good set the track record of 22.78 sec at the Firle Hill Climb on 28 May 1967, a record he holds in perpetuity, as the course closed at the end of the season.

In August 2005 David Good appeared at Shelsley Walsh for the centenary celebrations at the track driving his 1961-winning V-twin Cooper.

== Footnotes ==
Sporting positions
Preceded by David Boshier-Jones	British Hill Climb Champion; 1961	Succeeded by Arthur Owen
