= David Boshier-Jones =

British racing driver

David Boshier-Jones is a British racing driver, whose career ran from 1952 until his retirement in 1961. He competed both in circuit racing (Formula Three) and in hillclimbs, achieving success in both disciplines but particularly on the hills, where he claimed three successive British Hill Climb Championships, in 1958, 1959 and 1960.

Boshier-Jones at first drove a Kieft, but later progressed to a Cooper-JAP. It was with this car, fitted with an 1100cc twin-cylinder engine, that he won all three of his hillclimb titles.

David's two brothers, Peter and Anthony, also competed in motorsport.

== Notes ==
Sporting positions
Preceded by Tony Marsh	British Hill Climb Champion; 1958-1960	Succeeded by David Good
