= Martin Groves =

British hillclimb driver

Martin Groves is a British hillclimb driver, who won the British Hill Climb Championship in 2005, 2006, 2007 and 2010. With older cars he had won five rounds of the BHCC between 2001 and 2004, but in 2005 he was exceptionally quick in his new Gould GR55B, clinching the championship at Craigantlet in early August having finished first or second in every one of the 28 BHCC rounds up to that point. He retained the title in 2006, after fending off a strong challenge from Scott Moran.

Also in 2006, Groves drove a Gould (though a 2.65-litre car rather than his usual larger-capacity machine) at Bathurst in the Australian Hillclimb Championship, dipping well inside the hill record.

In 2007 Groves became the first man to dip under 23 seconds at Shelsley Walsh, when he recorded 22.86 seconds on 3 June. However, he lost the record to Scott Moran later that same day. At the final meeting of the 2007 Championship, at Shelsley Walsh on 7 October, Groves secured a hat-trick of titles when he won the first run-off, regaining the outright record in the process with a time of 22.81 seconds. On 17 August 2008, Groves lowered the record further to 22.58 seconds. This record stood for two days short of 13 years before being broken by Sean Gould, Wallace Menzies and Alex Summers on 15 August 2021.

At Val des Terres in July 2009, Groves equalled Roy Lane's long-standing record of 90 wins in BHCC rounds. He became the first driver to record 100 wins in August 2010, reaching the mark at Craigantlet.

== Notes ==
Sporting positions
Preceded by Adam Fleetwood	British Hill Climb Champion; 2005-2007	Succeeded by Scott Moran
Preceded by Scott Moran	British Hill Climb Champion; 2010	Succeeded by Scott Moran
