= David Hepworth (racing driver) =

David Hepworth (28 July 1939 – 2 May 1992) was a British racing driver, who won the British Hill Climb Championship twice, in 1969 and 1971. In the early-mid 1960s Hepworth drove an Austin-Healey 3000 fitted with a Chevrolet engine in both rallies and circuit racing, but by 1968 he was driving a Hepworth-Oldsmobile; in this he won a Formula Libre race at Croft late in that season.

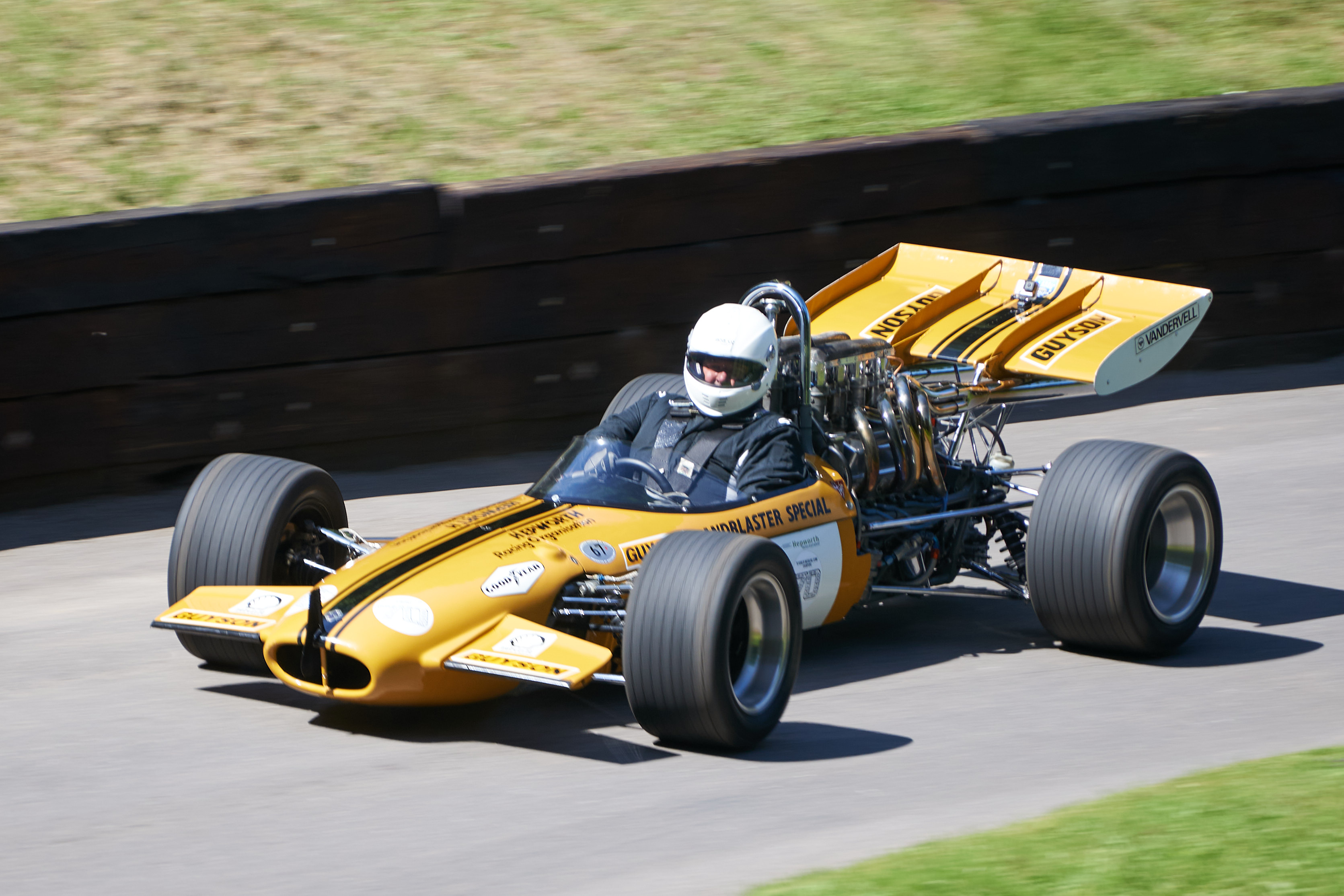
The 1969 Hepworth-Ferguson 4WD with 5-litre Chevy V8 at the 2021 Classic Nostalgia race.

In hillclimbing, Hepworth competed in a Repco-Brabham before turning to a self-constructed Hepworth-FF four-wheel drive special. With this car he won the British Hill Climb Championship in 1969 and 1971, in the latter year also becoming the first driver to break the 30-second barrier at Shelsley Walsh.

He drove a BRM-Chevrolet P154 (and later a P167) in Interserie racing (a European version of CanAm) between 1972 and 1974. Years later, a team run by Hepworth obtained the last BRM, the 1979 P230, and had it modified to CanAm spec, but the car was crashed and damaged by their test driver before it could be raced.

Sporting positions
Preceded by Peter Lawson	British Hill Climb Champion; 1969	Succeeded by Nicholas Williamson
Preceded by Nicholas Williamson	British Hill Climb Champion; 1971	Succeeded by Nicholas Williamson
