= Scott Moran =

British racing driver

Scott Moran (born 1976) is a British hillclimb driver, based in Ludlow, Shropshire. Scott Moran has won the British Hill Climb Championship six times (2008, 2009, 2011, 2013, 2014 and 2016) driving the Gould GR61X he shares with his father, 1997 British Champion Roger Moran. For some years Scott was the junior partner, but in 2006 he finished ahead in the British Championship standings for the first time, coming second with Roger third. In 2007 he finished second to Martin Groves and in 2008 sealed the championship at Gurston Down.

On 3 June 2007, after an epic battle at Shelsley Walsh with Martin Groves in which the outright hill record swapped back and forth several times, Moran ended the meeting as record-holder with a time of 22.83 seconds; the record (held by Groves) at the start of the day had been 23.75 seconds. He held the record until the very end of 2007, when it was snatched back by 0.02 seconds by Groves.

On 12 October 2014 he broke the track record of "Eschdorf FIA Hill Climb Masters" in the 2nd heat just before being beaten by the French championship leader, Nicolas Schatz, the final race winner.

== Notes ==
Sporting positions
Preceded by Martin Groves	British Hill Climb Champion; 2008-2009	Succeeded by Martin Groves
Preceded by Martin Groves	British Hill Climb Champion; 2011	Succeeded by Trevor Willis
Preceded by Trevor Willis	British Hill Climb Champion; 2013-2014	Succeeded by Alex Summers
Preceded by Alex Summers	British Hill Climb Champion; 2016	Succeeded by Trevor Willis
