= Wollaston, Shropshire =

Village in Shropshire, England

Coordinates: 52.704°N 2.994°W

Wollaston
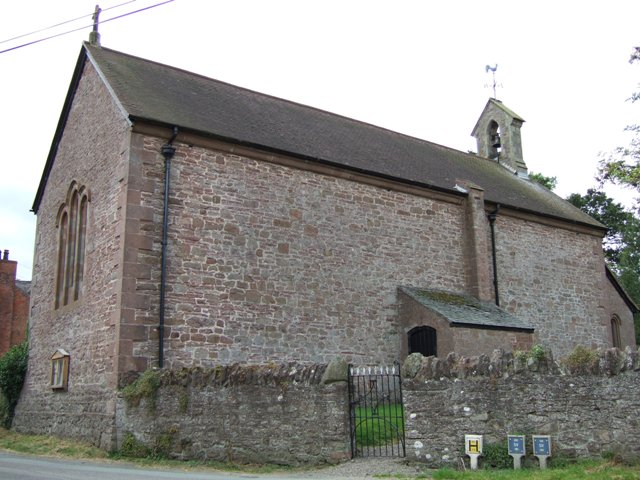
- St. John the Baptist church at Wollaston

- Location within Shropshire
- Population: 202 (2001 census)
- OS grid reference: SJ328123
- Civil parish: Alberbury with Cardeston; Westbury
- Unitary authority: Shropshire
- Ceremonial county: Shropshire
- Region: West Midlands
- Country: England
- Sovereign state: United Kingdom
- Post town: SHREWSBURY
- Postcode district: SY5
- Dialling code: 01743
- Police: West Mercia
- Fire: Shropshire
- Ambulance: West Midlands
- UK Parliament: Shrewsbury and Atcham

Wollaston is a small village and former civil parish, now in the parish of Alberbury with Cardeston, in the Shropshire district, in the ceremonial county of Shropshire, England, only a quarter of a mile from the Welsh border. In 2001 the parish had a population of 202.

Wollaston was formerly a chapelry in the parish of Alberbury, from 1866 Wollaston was a civil parish in its own right, on 1 April 2005 the parish was abolished. The area north of the Cambrian railway line, including Wollaston village, was merged with Alberbury with Cardeston; Winnington, the area south of the line, was merged with Westbury.

It is believed that Old Tom Parr was born in, or near, to the village at Winnington at The Glyn, according to the inscription on a brass plaque in the church.

There is a beacon here, by the church, that is to be lit in case of an invasion from Wales. Immediately west of the church are the earthwork remains of Wollaston Castle, a motte-and-bailey castle.

Half a mile south-east near Bretchel is the site of a small Norman motte castle known as The Beacon.

Previously served by Plas-y-Court Halt railway station on the Cambrian Line.

== See also ==
- Listed buildings in Alberbury with Cardeston
