= Old Tom Parr =

Englishman who was said to have lived for 152 years

Thomas Parr
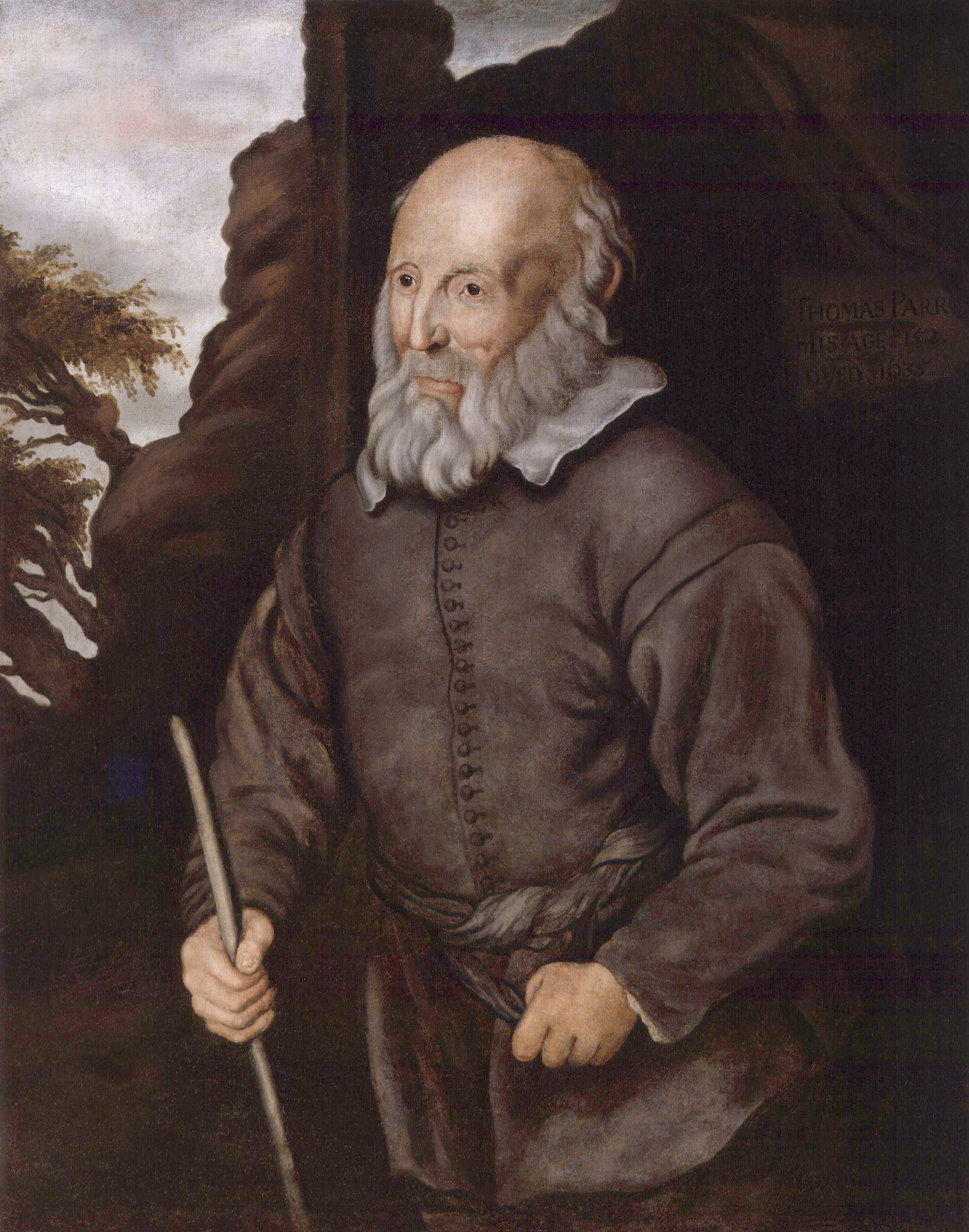
- Parr c.1635
- Born: c. 26 October 1482/1483 (reputedly); Parish of Alberbury, Shropshire
- Died: 13 November 1635 (claimed aged 152); London
- Burial place: Westminster Abbey, London
- Other name: Old Parr
- Occupation: Farm servant
- Known for: Longevity claimant
- Spouses: Jane Taylor (m. 1563; died 1593) Jane Lloyd (m. 1605)
- Children: 2 legitimate (died in infancy), 1 illegitimate

Thomas Parr (c. 1482 or 1483 (reputedly) – 13 November 1635), popularly known as "Old Parr", was an Englishman who was said to have lived for 152 years. A portrait of Parr hangs at Shrewsbury Museum and Art Gallery, with an inscription which reads "Thomas Parr died at the age of 152 years 19 days" "The old very old man or Thomas Parr, son of John Parr of Winnington in the Parish of Alberbury who was born in the year 1483 in the reign of King Edward IV being 152 years old in the year 1635." The portrait was once in the collection of the Leighton family of Loton Park, which is in Alberbury.

== Biography ==
=== Early life ===
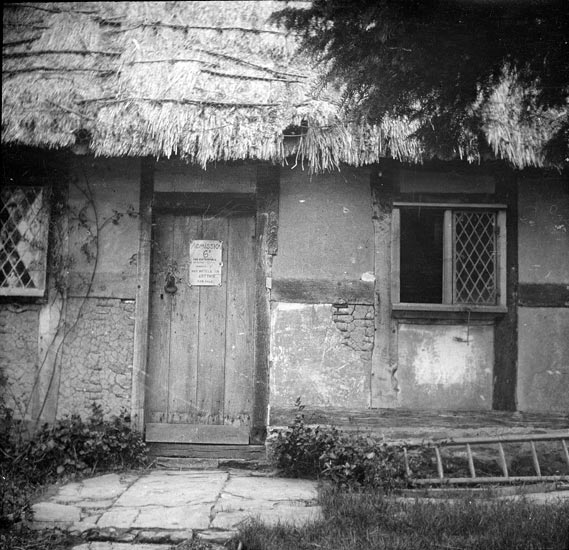
Old Parr's Cottage at Winnington, Shropshire

Records vary, but Parr was allegedly born around October 1482 or 1483, although he may have been born as recently as c. 1565, in the parish of Alberbury; he lived in the small hamlet of Winnington, in what is called now Old Parr's Cottage, within Shropshire. He thrived on a diet of "subrancid cheese and milk in every form, coarse and hard bread and small drink, generally sour whey," as the physician William Harvey wrote. "On this sorry fare, but living in his home, free from care, did this poor man attain to such length of days." He married Jane Taylor at the claimed age of 80 and had two children, both of whom died in infancy.

=== Old Parr's Cottage ===
A cottage at the hamlet of Winnington in the parish of Alberbury is traditionally identified as Parr's home. A view of "Old Parr's cottage" was engraved for The Gentleman's Magazine in 1814.

By the twentieth century the cottage had been restored and opened as a small museum of relics associated with Parr, with antique furniture and household items. A framed Bible page found in the chimney during repairs in 1900 was among the items kept there. The fireplace was restored about 1912 by the local antiquarian H. E. Forrest, and its carved beam bore a scriptural inscription.

The cottage was destroyed by fire on 28 June 1959. Firefighters from three stations could not save it, and only the chimney stack survived; the restored fireplace and its carved beam were lost. It was rebuilt in the 1980s, including a recreation of the fireplace beam, and the building is now let as a holiday cottage.

=== Later life ===
Thomas Parr purportedly had an affair when he was more than 100 years old, and fathered a child born out of wedlock, for which he had to do public penance in the church porch. After the death of his first known wife when he was at the alleged age of 110, he married Jane Lloyd, a widow, at the alleged age of 122. They lived together for 12 years, with Jane commenting that he never showed any signs of age or infirmity. As news of his reported age spread, 'Old Parr' became a national celebrity and was painted by Rubens and Van Dyck.

=== Death ===
In 1635, Thomas Howard, 21st Earl of Arundel, visited Parr and took him to London to meet King Charles I, presented as a "curious piece of nature". The Earl arranged for Parr's daughter-in-law to accompany him on the southward trip, as well as an entertainer known as Jack the Fool, to amuse Parr on the journey. The carriage and escort attracted large crowds as it travelled towards London, with people stifling the old man in an attempt to touch him and hear him speak. By the time he finally arrived in the capital, Parr was reportedly blind and feeble. King Charles I was reported to have asked Parr: "Master Parr, you have lived longer than other men. What have you done more than other men?" He replied that he had performed penance for an affair with Catherine Milton, a village maiden. The King was stern, stating: "Fie, fie old man. Can you remember nothing but your vices?"

Parr was treated as a spectacle in London, but the food and environment caused him to die within only a few weeks, on 13 November 1635. The King arranged for him to be buried in Westminster Abbey on 25 November [O.S. 15 November] 1635. (Note: During Parr's lifetime, two calendars were in use in Europe: the Julian ("Old Style") calendar in Protestant and Orthodox regions, including Britain; and the Gregorian ("New Style") calendar in Roman Catholic Europe. At Parr's burial, Gregorian dates were ten days ahead of Julian's dates: thus his burial is recorded as taking place on 15 November 1635 Old Style but can be converted to a New Style (modern) date of 25 November 1635.) The inscription of his gravestone reads:

THO: PARR OF YE COUNTY OF SALLOP, BORNE.
IN AD: 1483. HE LIVED IN YE REIGNES OF TEN
PRINCES VIZ: K.ED.4. K.ED.5. K.RICH.3.
K.HEN.7. K.HEN.8. K.EDW.6. Q.MA. Q.ELIZ.
K.JA. & K. CHARLES. AGED 152 YEARS.
& WAS BURYED HERE NOVEMB. 15. 1635.

== Doubts regarding his age ==
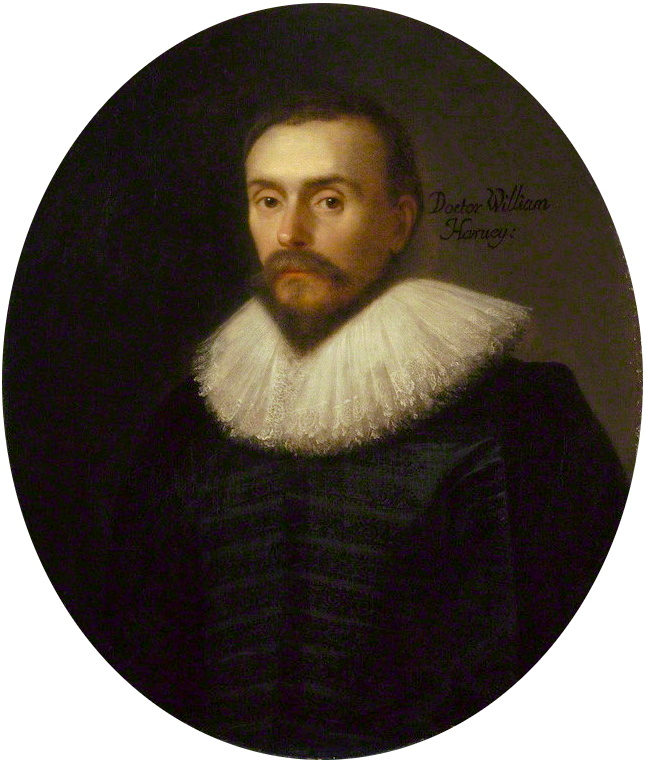
William Harvey, who carried out the autopsy on Thomas Parr

William Harvey, the physician who discovered the circulation of the blood, performed an autopsy on Parr's body. The results were published in the book De ortu et natura sanguinis by John Betts as an attachment. Harvey examined Parr's body and found all his internal organs to be in a perfect state. No apparent cause of death could be determined, and it was assumed that Parr had simply died of overexposure because he had been too well fed. A modern interpretation of the results of the autopsy suggests that Parr was probably around 70 years of age.

It is possible that Parr's birth records were confused with those of his namesake grandfather. Parr did not claim to be able to remember specific events from the 15th century.
