= Halfway House, Shropshire =

Village in Shropshire, England

Coordinates: 52.698°N 2.975°W

Halfway House
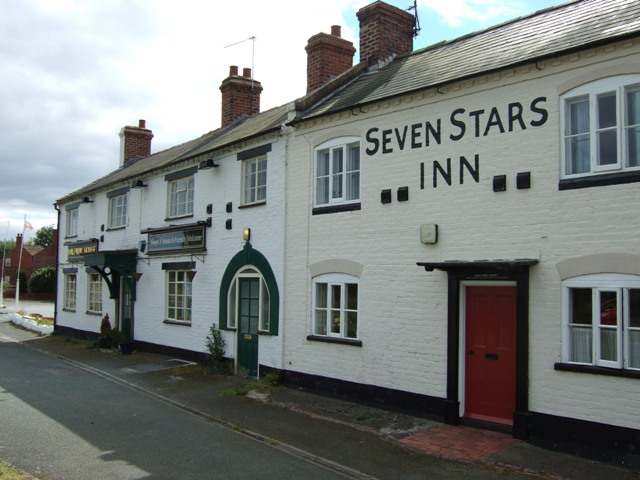
- The Halfway House and the Seven Stars Inn public houses

- Location within Shropshire
- OS grid reference: SJ341116
- Civil parish: Alberbury with Cardeston
- Unitary authority: Shropshire
- Ceremonial county: Shropshire
- Region: West Midlands
- Country: England
- Sovereign state: United Kingdom
- Post town: SHREWSBURY
- Postcode district: SY5
- Dialling code: 01743
- Police: West Mercia
- Fire: Shropshire
- Ambulance: West Midlands
- UK Parliament: Shrewsbury and Atcham

Halfway House is a village in Shropshire, England, halfway between Shrewsbury and Welshpool (in Wales) on the A458 road. Also, it is known to be halfway between Birmingham and Aberystwyth.

It had a pub called the 'Halfway House' which is now abandoned. Its neighbouring village, Wattlesborough, has a shop and a cafe. It also has a village hall which is shared with Halfway House. A mile to the north-east at Wattlesborough Hall the 12th century keep of Wattlesborough Castle survives, adjoining an 18th-century farmhouse.

== See also ==
- Listed buildings in Alberbury with Cardeston
