= Alberbury Priory =

Medieval monastic house in Alberbury, Shropshire

Coordinates: 52.7311°N 2.9267°W

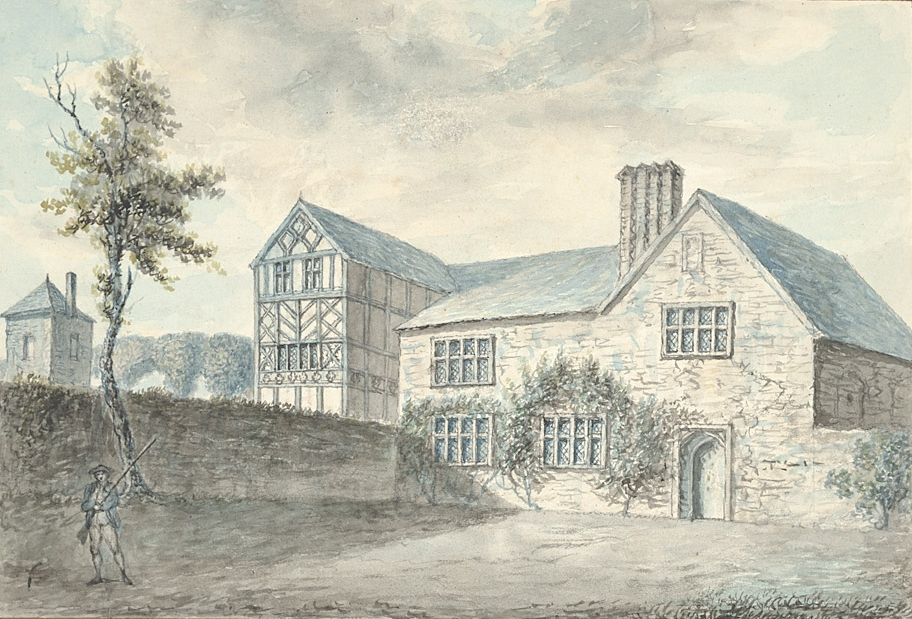
Alberbury Priory (Abbot's House), 1796

Alberbury Priory was a medieval monastic house in Alberbury, Shropshire, England, established c.1230. It was one of three houses in England belonging to the French Grandmontine Order.

The monastery was small, with only 7 monks under a prior in occupancy in 1344, possibly supported by 'lay brothers' who did manual work.

In 1359, the then prior of Alberbury was deposed for alleged violence, murder, and dissipation of the priory's goods. In 1364, one of his successors was outlawed for alleged murder and fled the house.

Alberbury Priory was dissolved in 1441 when King Henry VI, who had seized the alien houses during the Hundred Years War, gave it as an endowment to All Souls' College, Oxford.

== Burials ==
- Fulk I FitzWarin
- Maud le Vavasour, Baroness Butler
- Fulk FitzWarin
