= Baron FitzWarin =

Title in the Peerage of England

Arms of FitzWarin: Quarterly per fess indented argent and gules, as given for Fulk V FitzWarin in the St George's Roll, 1285

Differenced arms of Wiliam FitzWarin, per the Gelre Armorial, c. 1370 – 1414: Quarterly per fess indented ermine and gules

Baron FitzWarin (also written FitzWaryn, FitzWarine, and other spellings) was a title in the Peerage of England created by writ of summons for Fulk V FitzWarin in 1295. His family had been magnates for nearly a century, at least since 1205 when his grandfather Fulk III FitzWarin obtained Whittington Castle near Oswestry, which was their main residence and the seat of a marcher lordship.

All the male heirs were given the first name Fulk, and the barony with the castle and lordship of Whittington descended from father to son until 1420. It then passed to an heiress, Elizabeth FitzWarin, and from her to the Bourchier family, with John Bourchier being created Earl of Bath in 1536. The line ended with the death of Edward Bourchier, 4th Earl of Bath in 1636. In 1913 the title was unsuccessfully claimed by Sir Robert Wrey, a distant relative who had acquired parts of what had been the FitzWarin estate.

== Predecessors of barons ==
- Fulk I FitzWarin (died before 1172), a supporter of King Henry II, of Whittington in Shropshire and Alveston in Gloucestershire, son of the "shadowy or mythical" Warin of Metz.
- Fulk II FitzWarin (died after 1194), married Hawise, daughter and co-heiress of Joceas de Dinan. His younger son was William FitzWarin who obtained the Devon manor of Brightley and adopted the last name of Brightley.
- Fulk III FitzWarin (died after 1250), held Whittington Castle in 1204 and was the subject of a legend Romance of Fouke le Fitz Waryn
- Sir Fulk IV FitzWarin (died 1264), drowned in the River Ouse while fleeing from the Battle of Lewes.

== Barons FitzWarin (1295) ==
- Fulk FitzWarin, 1st Baron FitzWarin (1251–1315), summoned to Parliament as Lord Fitzwarine 23 June 1295.
- Fulk FitzWarin, 2nd Baron FitzWarin (c.1280–1336), son
- Fulk FitzWarin, 3rd Baron FitzWarin (c.1310–1349), son, he married the daughter of Henry de Beaumont 1st Baron Beaumont, 4th Earl of Buchan
- Fulk FitzWarin, 4th Baron FitzWarin (1341–1374), son, he married Margaret Audley (FitzWarin)
- Fulk FitzWarin, 5th Baron FitzWarin (1365–1391), son, who married Elizabeth Cogan granddaughter of Neil Loring
- Fulk FitzWarin, 6th Baron FitzWarin(1389–1407), son married Alice daughter of William de Botreaux, 2nd Baron Botreaux
- Fulk FitzWarin, 7th Baron FitzWarin(1406–1420), son
- Elizabeth FitzWarin,(c.1404–1427), sister, married Sir Richard Hankford of Annery in Devon,
- Thomasine Hankford, daughter, (1423–1453), married Sir William Bourchier (1407–1470). He was summoned to Parliament in her right as 9th Baron FitzWarin.
- Fulk Bourchier, 10th Baron FitzWarin (1445–1479)
- John Bourchier, 11th Baron FitzWarin (1470–1539) created Earl of Bath in 1536
- John Bourchier, 2nd Earl of Bath (1499–1561), 12th Baron FitzWarin
- William Bourchier, 3rd Earl of Bath (bef. 1557–1623), 13th Baron FitzWarin
- Edward Bourchier, 4th Earl of Bath (1590 – 1636), 14th Baron FitzWarin. On his death, the barony of FitzWarin fell into abeyance between his daughters Anne, Elizabeth, and Dorothy.

== See also ==
- Whittington Castle
