= Listed buildings in Alberbury with Cardeston =

Alberbury with Cardeston is a civil parish in Shropshire, England. It contains 58 listed buildings that are recorded in the National Heritage List for England. Of these, one is listed at Grade I, the highest of the three grades, seven are at Grade II*, the middle grade, and the others are at Grade II, the lowest grade. The parish contains the villages and settlements of Alberbury, Cardeston, Wollaston, Halfway House, and Rowton, and is otherwise rural. In the parish the listed buildings include two ruined castles, two country houses and associated structures including lodges, and three churches and items in the churchyards. Most of the other listed buildings are houses, cottages, farmhouses and farm buildings, and the rest include the remains of a windmill, two milestones, a public house, and a war memorial. Three of the listed buildings are also Scheduled Monuments.

== Key ==
| Grade | Criteria |
|---|---|
| I | Buildings of exceptional interest, sometimes considered to be internationally important |
| II* | Particularly important buildings of more than special interest |
| II | Buildings of national importance and special interest |

== Buildings ==
| Name and location | Photograph | Date | Notes | Grade |
|---|---|---|---|---|
| St Michael's Church, Alberbury; 52.72384°N 2.95113°W | | Late 12th century (probable) | The oldest part of the church is the base of the tower, the south aisle dates from 1320 to 1330, the chancel was largely rebuilt in 1845–46, parts of the nave were rebuilt in 1846–47, and the church was restored in 1902–03. The tower is in Alberbury breccia with red sandstone dressings, the rest of the church is in sandstone, and the roof is tiled. The church consists of a nave, a south aisle, a chancel with a north vestry, and a north tower. The tower has four stages, clasping buttresses, a parapet on the north side with a gargoyle, and a saddleback roof with lucarnes and finials. | II* |
| White Abbey and wall 52.73102°N 2.92636°W | | c. 1225 | The abbey was founded by Fulk FitzWarin, it was converted into a house in about 1578 and was remodelled in 1857–58. It is in Alberbury breccia and red sandstone, and the later parts are in red brick. The house has two storeys and an attic, with a main range and two parallel wings at the rear, and it incorporates a former chapel. At the front are three bays, a central doorway with a moulded pointed arch, a fanlight, and a hood mould. To the right is a canted bay window. Attached to the front is a short section of wall. | II* |
| Alberbury Castle; 52.72347°N 2.95201°W | | Early 13th century (probable) | The castle was built by Fulk FitzWarin, and is now in ruins. It is in Alberbury breccia with red sandstone dressings. The ruins consist of a two-storey keep, with a bailey to the northeast. In the keep are openings with round and pointed arches. There are two 19th-century doorways with pointed arches in the bailey walls. The building is also a Scheduled Monument. | II |
| Wattlesborough Castle; 52.70738°N 2.95601°W | | Late 13th century (probable) | The remains of a tower house in sandstone with a wing to the northeast in Alberbury breccia and red sandstone. The main part had two storeys including an undercroft, and the wing one storey. The roof has been lost. The building is also a Scheduled Monument. | I |
| Churchyard cross 52.72366°N 2.95117°W | — | 15th century (probable) | The cross is in the churchyard of St Michael's Church, and has been converted into a sundial. It is in red sandstone, and has four square steps, a square chamfered base, and a tapering square shaft with chamfered and stopped corners and a moulded neck. On this is a 17th-century cubic sundial block with a damaged pyramidal cap. The cross is also a Scheduled Monument. | II* |
| Benthall Cross; 52.71501°N 2.88913°W | — | 15th or 16th century (probable) | The remains of a wayside cross, consisting of an L-shaped piece of red sandstone. | II |
| Grange Farmhouse; 52.69828°N 2.92961°W | — | Late 15th or early 16th century (probable) | The farmhouse is timber framed, it has been extended, and the external walls have been rebuilt in sandstone and brick, with a dentil eaves cornice, and it has an asbestos slate roof. There are two storeys and five bays. On the front is a doorway with a moulded architrave and a gabled brick porch, and there is another doorway with a brick porch to the right. The windows are casements, those in the ground floor with segmental heads. Inside are four full cruck trusses. | II |
| Lower Bulthy Cottage; 52.71951°N 3.01258°W | | 16th century (probable) | A timber framed cottage on a sandstone plinth, with red brick nogging and a cruck truss, and partly rebuilt in sandstone and red brick. It has a thatched roof, one storey with an attic, and two bays. The windows are casements, and inside is a full cruck truss. | II |
| Former cottage and farm buildings, Lower Eyton Farmhouse; 52.72049°N 2.92466°W | — | 16th or 17th century (probable) | The buildings were originally timber framed with cruck trusses and brick nogging, and were later extended and partly rebuilt in Alberbury breccia and red brick. The building has an L-shaped plan, the north range consisting of the former two-bay cottage to the west, a two-bay cowhouse to the east, and a three-bay barn at right angles to the south forming an east range. They have one storey with an attic or a loft, and roof partly of tile and partly of asbestos sheet. There are two gabled dormers in the former cottage, and elsewhere are casement windows, doorways and loft doors. Inside the cottage are two full cruck trusses. | II |
| House at Wollaston Farm; 52.70415°N 2.99350°W | — | 17th century | The house was altered and extended in the following centuries. It is partly timber framed with brick nogging, and partly in stone with brick quoins and dressings, and dentilled eaves. It has a Welsh slate roof, and the east gable is rendered. The main part has two storeys and seven bays, to the north is an extension with a single storey and three bays, and to the west is another single-storey extension. On the south front is a French window, and most of the other windows are casements with segmental heads. | II |
| Benthall Farmhouse; 52.71990°N 2.89772°W | — | c. 1660 | The farmhouse was later extended. It is in red brick on a chamfered stone plinth, bands, and a hipped slate roof. There are three storeys and the house has a T-shaped plan, with a wing to the east. The entrance front has three bays, the first two bays projecting and gabled, with a porch in the angle, and there is a single-storey wing to the right. The windows are a mix of sashes and casements. | II* |
| Garden wall, Benthall Farmhouse; 52.71982°N 2.89783°W | — | c. 1660 | The garden wall has a L-shaped plan, linking the farmhouse to the former stable block. It is in red brick on a protruding red sandstone plinth, with chamfered grey sandstone coping. | II |
| Former stable block, Benthall Farm; 52.71957°N 2.89774°W | — | c. 1660 | The farm building is in red brick on a chamfered plinth of red sandstone, with a dentil brick string course at the rear, a projecting eaves cornice, and a hipped slate roof. It contains doors and loft doors, some boarded, and inside are timber framed cross-walls. | II |
| Loton Park; 52.72639°N 2.95395°W | | c. 1670 | A country house, originally with a U-shaped plan, a large wing was added to the southeast in 1872–73. The house is built in red brick with dressings in red and grey sandstone and a tile roof. The earlier part has a plinth, quoins, chamfered, coped and parapeted gables with finials. There are two storeys, a basement and attics, and a front of five bays, the outer bays projecting and gabled. In the centre is a three-bay loggia-porch that has arches with imposts, Tuscan columns, an entablature, and a balustrade. Above, the central window has Corinthian columns and a broken triangular pediment containing a cartouche, and above that is a gabled half-dormer. The later wing to the right has one storey with attics, and nine bays, and contains gables, mullioned and transomed windows, and a full-height canted bay window. | II* |
| Former hunting lodge 52.71680°N 2.95161°W | — | c. 1675 | The former hunting lodge is in Alberbury breccia on a chamfered plinth, with red sandstone dressings, a moulded string course, and a pyramidal slate roof. There are two storeys, a square plan, and a cubic shape. The windows vary: some are mullioned and square, some are circular, and some are rectangular with moulded surrounds and lintels with triangular heads. | II* |
| Rose Cottage; 52.70537°N 2.94121°W | — | c. 1700 | A timber framed house with brick nogging on a stone plinth with a tiled roof. The rear wall has been rebuilt in sandstone. There is one storey with an attic, a two-bay front, and two lean-to additions. In the front is a gabled dormer, and the windows are casements. | II |
| Rowton Castle and stable courtyard 52.70878°N 2.92067°W | | c. 1700 | A country house, later a hotel, it was extended in 1809–12, and again in 1824–28. The house is built in Alberbury breccia with sandstone dressings, and has a hipped slate roof. Part of it is in two storeys with a basement and attic, and the other part has three storeys. The central block of the entrance front has five bays, the middle three projecting and containing a central entrance with a four-centred arch and a pierced parapet. Above it is a canted bay window with an embattled parapet. There are windows in the other bays and above, and the flanking bays have gabled dormers. To the right is a gabled wing with octagonal corner turrets, and to the left is an octagonal tower. At the rear is a central full-height octagonal bay window, a three-bay loggia, a three-storey two-bay square tower to the left, and a large circular tower to the right. Also at the rear is a stable courtyard forming two sides of a square, including a gateway and two square towers. | II* |
| Wattlesborough Hall; 52.70729°N 2.95585°W | — | c. 1711 | A sandstone farmhouse, the left gable end rendered, on a plinth, with a moulded eaves cornice and a parapeted and coped gable. There are two storeys, five bays, and a single-storey rear extension. The central doorway has a rusticated surround and a five-keyed lintel. The windows are cross-windows with triple-keyed lintels. | II |
| Lower Eyton Farmhouse; 52.72039°N 2.92482°W | — | Early 18th century | A red brick farmhouse, possibly incorporating a 17th-century timber framed house, and extended to the north and west in the 19th century. It has a tiled roof with a crowstepped gable, two storeys with an attic and an east front of three bays. On the front is a lead-to porch, and most of the windows are casements with segmental heads. | II |
| Sundial; 52.72411°N 2.95051°W | — | Early 18th century | The sundial is in the churchyard of St Michael's Church, Alberbury. It is in red sandstone, and has a square chamfered base on a square step, a baluster with a square plan and a moulded waist and neck, and a square dial block. On the top is a copper dial and a 20th-century gnomon. | II |
| The Old Post Office; 52.72414°N 2.94987°W | — | Early 18th century | A brick house on a chamfered plinth, with a band, an eaves cornice with moulded dentils, and a tile roof with a parapeted gable end. There are two storeys and an attic, and a front of four bays. The windows are cross-casements, those in the ground floor with segmental heads. In the gable end is a recessed porch. | II |
| The Green Dragon; 52.72410°N 2.94964°W | — | Early to mid 18th century | A house, at one time a public house, in brick, on a plinth, with a band and a slate roof. There are two storeys and a front of five bays. On the front is a doorway with a moulded architrave, and a gabled porch with cast iron columns. Most of the windows are cross-windows with segmental heads. | II |
| St Michael's Church, Cardeston; 52.70507°N 2.89578°W | | 1749 | The church incorporates material from the 12th century, the tower was added in 1844, and the church was restored and a vestry added in 1905. It is built in Alberbury breccia with sandstone dressings and a tiled roof. The church consists of a nave, a short chancel with a north vestry, and a semi-detached west tower. The tower has three stages; the lower two stages are square and broach to an octagonal bell stage. At the top is an embattled parapet and a pyramidal cap with a weathervane. | II |
| Red Abbey; 52.72815°N 2.93085°W | | Late 18th century | A farmhouse in red brick with a dentil eaves cornice and a slate roof. It has a T-shaped plan, three storeys, a front of two bays, and a semicircular stair tower at the rear. The central doorway has a moulded architrave and a flat hood on shaped brackets. Most of the windows are casements with segmental heads, and in the stair tower is a vertical slit window. | II |
| Milestone near English Lodge; 52.72391°N 2.95592°W | — | Late 18th century | The milestone is in red sandstone. It has a square base, and broaches to a triangular shaft. On the base is inscribed "Alberbury", and on the sides are the distances in miles to "Salop" (Shrewsbury), and to Llanfyllin. | II |
| Remains of windmill 52.71023°N 2.94092°W | | Late 18th century (probable) | The windmill is built in Alberbury breccia and is partly rendered. It consists of a roofless circular tapering tower with three storeys, and contains segmental-headed window openings and blocked doorways. | II |
| St John's Church, Wollaston; 52.70419°N 2.99406°W | | 1787–88 | In 1885–86 the church was restored and a porch and vestry were added, and in 1911 a bellcote was added. The church is in Alberbury breccia and sandstone and has a tile roof. It consists of a nave and chancel in one cell, a west porch and a north vestry. On the west gable is a gabled bellcote with a weathervane, and on the east gable is a cross. The windows have round arches, and the east window consists of three round-headed stepped lancets. | II |
| Bulthy Farmhouse; 52.71477°N 3.00980°W | — | c. 1800 | The farmhouse is in red brick on a red sandstone plinth, and has a tile roof with parapeted gable ends. It has an L-shaped plan, with a main block of three storeys and three bays, and a two-storey rear wing. On the front is a gabled porch, in the lower two floors are sash windows, with casement windows in the top floor. | II |
| Rowton Lodge; 52.70704°N 2.91671°W | | 1809–12 | The lodge is at the southeast entrance to Rowton Castle, and is in cottage orné style. It is built in Alberbury breccia with dressings in red sandstone, and has a hipped thatched roof. There is one storey, a three-bay loggia-porch to the left, and a canted bay window to the right. The porch has three chamfered Tudor arches, and the windows are casements. | II |
| Chest tomb 52.72374°N 2.95135°W | — | Early 19th century (probable) | The chest tomb is in the churchyard of St Michael's Church. It is in sandstone, and has a chamfered top with a moulded cornice, semicircular side panels flanked by fluted pilaster strips, and raised oval end panels. The inscription and dedication are illegible. | II |
| Heath Farmhouse; 52.69878°N 2.89146°W | — | Early 19th century | A sandstone farmhouse with brick dressings, dentil eaves, and a two-span tiled roof. There are two storeys, a double-depth plan, a symmetrical front of three bays, and a lean-to outshut at the rear. The central doorway has a rectangular fanlight, and the windows are casements. | II |
| Milestone near Stockfield; 52.71496°N 2.91063°W | — | Early 19th century (probable) | The milestone is in red sandstone and has a triangular top. It contains a bench mark but the inscription is illegible. | II |
| Sundial, Loton Park; 52.72600°N 2.95421°W | — | Early 19th century (probable) | The sundial is in a gassed area to the southwest of the house. It is in red sandstone and has a stepped square base, a circular shaft, and a square top inscribed on the sides. On the top is an inscribed square copper dial and a gnomon. | II |
| Retaining wall and tower, Rowton Castle; 52.70914°N 2.92113°W | — | Early 19th century | The terrace retaining wall is to the northwest of the castle and is in Alberbury breccia and has a parapet with red sandstone coping. It has a U-shaped plan, the main part about 3 metres (9.8 ft) high and 80 metres (260 ft) long, and the sides walls 1 metre (3 ft 3 in) high and 35 metres (115 ft) and 30 metres (98 ft) long respectively. There are buttresses at the corners and bastions with embattled parapets. At the northwest end is a projecting two-storey tower with a plinth, a cornice, and an embattled parapet, and at the southeast is a flight of steps. | II |
| Lower House Farmhouse; 52.70296°N 2.90227°W | — | Early 19th century | The farmhouse is in Alberbury breccia on a plinth, with dressings in red brick, and a hipped slate roof. It has two storeys, an L-shaped plan with a three-bay front, and a rear wing. Between the bays on the front are pilaster strips, and the central doorway has reeded pilasters, a radial fanlight and a cornice on shaped brackets. On the front are sash windows, and the windows elsewhere are a mixture of sashes and casements. | II |
| Malt-house, Red Abbey; 52.72826°N 2.93063°W | — | Early 19th century (probable) | The malt house consists of a main range and a wing. It is in Alberbury breccia and red sandstone with some dressings in red brick and a dentil eaves cornice. The roof over the main range is in slate and corrugated iron, and over the wing it is tiled. The main range has three storeys and the wing has two. Its features include mullioned windows, external steps, doorways, and vents. | II |
| Upper Eyton Farmhouse; 52.71908°N 2.92502°W | — | Early 19th century | The farmhouse is in Alberbury breccia and red sandstone with dressings in red brick and sandstone, quoins, a dentil eaves cornice, and a slate roof. It has an L-shaped plan with a main block of three storeys, a two-storey rear wing, and a front of three bays. In the centre is a flat porch on square columns, and a doorway with a reeded architrave with paterae, and a moulded cornice. In the lower two floors the windows are sashes, in the top floor they are casements. They have wedge lintels, apart from the middle window in the top floor, which has a segmental head. | II |
| The Tower House and walls, Rowton Castle; 52.70873°N 2.92109°W | — | 1828 | Originally the service block, later a private house, it is in Alberbury breccia with red sandstone dressings and a tile roof. The house consists of a central block on a plinth, with two storeys and two bays, with flanking three-storey towers. The towers have cornices and chamfered and coped embattled parapets. On the ground floor are cross-windows, there are casement windows in the middle floor and chamfered slit windows in the top floor. Most of the doors and windows have hood moulds. Attached to the house are two walls linking the house to Rowton Castle. | II |
| Thornes memorial 52.72375°N 2.95100°W | — | 1828 | The memorial is in the churchyard of St Michael's Church immediately to the south of the church, and is to the memory of a former vicar of the church and his family. It is a chest tomb in sandstone, and has a base, a plinth, a moulded cornice, battered sides, a chamfered top with panelled ends, and antefixae. In the tomb are inscribed recessed panels. | II |
| Welsh Lodge; 52.72543°N 2.95944°W | | 1832 | The lodge is at the southwest entrance to Loton Park. It is in Alberbury breccia on a plinth, with red sandstone dressings, a moulded eaves cornice, and a tiled roof that has parapeted gables with chamfered coping and obelisk finials. The lodge has an irregular L-shaped plan, one storey, a basement and an attic. On the southeast front is a gabled porch and a doorway with a chamfered Tudor arched head, and in the southeast front is a canted bay window. The windows are mullioned with cast iron lozenge-pattern tracery. | II |
| Gate pier southeast of Welsh Lodge; 52.72536°N 2.95929°W | — | c. 1832 | The gate pier is in red sandstone. It has a square plan, trefoil-headed panelled sides, and a top with gables on each side. | II |
| Stable block and walls, Loton Park; 52.72605°N 2.95495°W | — | 1833 | The stable block is in red brick on a chamfered plinth, with dressings in red sandstone, and a tiled roof that has parapeted gables with chamfered coping and obelisk finials. The block has a U-shaped plan, and one storey and an attic, and it contains a Tudor arched gateway. Above this is a gable containing a clock face with an octagonal surround flanked by half-dormers. In the entrance front are mullioned and transomed windows containing lozenge-pattern cast iron tracery. Attached to the block are two sections of walls. | II |
| Terrace retaining wall to northeast, Loton Park; 52.72671°N 2.95392°W | — | 1835 | The terrace retaining wall is to the northeast of the house. It is in sandstone with a U-shaped plan and is about 80 metres (260 ft) long. It has a parapet with chamfered coping. In the wall are two sections with square-section balusters, square piers with urns, and an arch at the southeast end leading to a tunnel. | II |
| Retaining wall and gate pier, Welsh Lodge; 52.72534°N 2.95949°W | — | c. 1839 | The wall encloses the garden in an irregular U-shaped plan to the southwest of the lodge. It is in Alberbury breccia with chamfered red sandstone coping. At the east end is a gate pier in red sandstone with a square plan, trefoil-headed panelled sides, and a top with gables on each side. | II |
| Forecourt retaining wall, Loton Park; 52.72575°N 2.95441°W | — | c. 1840 | The wall is in sandstone, about 40 metres (130 ft) long, with the ends canted back. The canted parts have parapets with chamfered plinths and copings. They have are square inner piers with urn finials, and square outer piers with trefoil-panelled sides and gabled tops. To the southwest is a ha-ha. | II |
| Urn (east), Loton Park; 52.72576°N 2.95431°W | — | c. 1840 | The urn is one of a pair in the formal garden. It is in red sandstone, it has an octagonal plan, and consists of moulded base and a bowl with quatrefoil-in-lozenge side panels. | II |
| Urn (west), Loton Park); 52.72579°N 2.95444°W | — | c. 1840 | The urn is one of a pair in the formal garden. It is in red sandstone, it has an octagonal plan, and consists of moulded base and a bowl with quatrefoil-in-lozenge side panels. | II |
| Former estate office and walls, Loton Park; 52.72583°N 2.95374°W | — | 1843 | A gateway was attached to the right of the estate office in 1845. The building is in red brick on a chamfered plinth with dressings in red sandstone, and a tiled roof that has chamfered coped gables with obelisk finials. There is one storey with an attic, and it contains gables, dormers, a doorway with a hood mould, and mullioned casement windows with lozenge-pattern cast iron tracery. Attached to the building are three sections of wall that are included in the listing. | II |
| English Lodge; 52.72294°N 2.95218°W | | 1849 | The lodge is at the southeast entrance to Loton Park. It is in Alberbury breccia on a chamfered plinth, with red sandstone dressings, a moulded eaves cornice, and a tiled roof with ridge cresting, parapeted gables with chamfered coping and globe finials. The lodge has a T-shaped plan, one storey and an attic. On the west front is a two-storey porch, a doorway with a moulded surround and a Tudor arched head, and a hood mould, and a single-light attic window above. On the south front is a canted oriel window in the attic, and the other windows are mullioned containing lights with Tudor arched heads. | II |
| Railings, gate and gate piers, English Lodge; 52.72289°N 2.95226°W | — | c. 1849 | A pair of piers flank the pedestrian gate to the right of the drive. They are square, with moulded bases, panelled sides, and have tops with gables on each side. The left pier has a motif. The piers, railings and gates are all in cast iron. | II |
| Two piers and railings, English Lodge; 52.72289°N 2.95231°W | — | c. 1849 | There is a pier to the left of the drive, railings to the left of it, and an end pier. The piers are square, with moulded bases, panelled sides, and have tops with gables on each side. The right pier has a motif. The piers and railings are in cast iron. | II |
| Terrace retaining walls to northwest, Loton Park; 52.72657°N 2.95410°W | — | 1850 | The terrace retaining walls and steps are in sandstone. There are two flight of steps, one with five steps and the other with six. They are on a chamfered plinth, and have chamfered coping and square piers with urns. | II |
| Wall southeast of Alberbury Castle; 52.72309°N 2.95176°W | — | Mid 19th century (probable) | The wall forms a link between Alberbury Castle and English Lodge. It is in Alberbury breccia with red sandstone dressings and coping stones of alternate heights. It contains a doorway with a pointed chamfered arch, and is about 50 metres (160 ft) long and 2.5 metres (8 ft 2 in) high. | II |
| Wall southwest of Alberbury Castle; 52.72321°N 2.95215°W | — | Mid 19th century (probable) | The wall forms a link between Alberbury Castle and English Lodge. It is in Alberbury breccia with red sandstone dressings. It contains a doorway at the north end with a pointed chamfered arch, and is about 50 metres (160 ft) long and between 2.5 metres (8 ft 2 in) and 3 metres (9.8 ft) high. | II |
| Pump, Red Abbey; 52.72821°N 2.93087°W | — | Mid to late 19th century | The pump is in cast iron, and has a circular shaft with moulded rings, a fluted top with a spout, a fluted domed cap with a spike finial, and a double-curved handle. | II |
| Pump and basin, White Abbey Farmhouse; 52.73110°N 2.92633°W | — | Mid to late 19th century | The pump is in cast iron, and has a circular shaft with moulded rings, a fluted top with a spout, a fluted domed cap with a spike finial, and a double-curved handle. The basin is square, and in grey sandstone. | II |
| Halfway House and Seven Stars Inn; 52.69801°N 2.97887°W | | c. 1870 | A house and a public house in brick with a dentil cornice, a Welsh slate roof, and two storeys. The public house has three bays, a central doorway, and casement windows. | II |
| War memorial 52.72279°N 2.95193°W | | 1919 | The war memorial is in limestone, and consists of a pedestal on three square steps, surmounted by an aedicule. The pedestal has a moulded plinth, and a moulded and decorated cornice, and the aedicule is octagonal with Ionic columns carrying an entablature and an ogee dome with a cross finial, and containing an urn. On the faces of the plinth are panels with inscriptions relating to both World Wars, and on the north face is a panel with a low relief depicting a soldier and an angel. | II |
