= Rowton =

Rowton may refer to:

== Places in England ==
- Rowton, Cheshire
- Rowton, Shropshire
- Rowton Castle, a Grade II listed building in Shropshire

== Other uses ==
- Battle of Rowton Heath, a battle during the English Civil War
- Montagu Corry, 1st Baron Rowton, Victorian philanthropist
- Rowton Houses, a chain of hostels founded by Lord Rowton
- Rowton (horse), a Thoroughbred racehorse
