= Fulk I FitzWarin =

Fulk I FitzWarin (born c. 1115, died 1170/1) (alias Fulke, Fouke, FitzWaryn, FitzWarren, Fitz Warine, etc., Latinised to Fulco Filius Warini, "Fulk son of Warin") was a powerful marcher lord seated at Whittington Castle in Shropshire in England on the border with Wales, and also at Alveston in Gloucestershire. His grandson was Fulk III FitzWarin (c. 1160–1258) the subject of the famous mediaeval legend or "ancestral romance" entitled Fouke le Fitz Waryn, himself the grandfather of Fulk V FitzWarin, 1st Baron FitzWarin (1251–1315).

== Origins ==
A later medieval romance, Fouke le Fitz Waryn, claims that Fulk Fitzwarin was the son of a man named Warin de Meer (Modern French: Guarine de Meer), from Metz, in Lorraine. (The Norman French patronymic fitz, is the equivalent of the modern French fils de "son of".) Warin – who appears in Fouke le Fitz Waryn as "Warin de Meer" – is, however, a "shadowy or mythical figure" about whom little is known.

It has sometimes been claimed that Warin de Meer came to England during the reign of William the Conqueror (1066–1087). However, he was not recorded as a tenant-in-chief – a feudal baron who was a direct vassal of the king – during William's reign. Instead, the Fitzwarin family's lands were obtained from later kings.

== Career ==
Fulk was rewarded by King Henry II (1154–1189) for his support of Henry's mother Empress Matilda in her civil war with King Stephen (1135–1154) and conferred to him the royal manor of Alveston in Gloucestershire and the manor of Blewbury in Berkshire.

== Marriage and children ==
Fulk married Malet Peveral, daughter of Pagan Peveral, and they had children including the following:

- Fulk II FitzWarin (fl. 1194), son and heir who held his father's lands following his death in 1170/1.
- William de Brightley, younger son, who according to Sir William Pole (d.1635) was granted by his father "in King Henry 2 tyme" (i.e. between 1154 and 1189) the Devonshire manor of Brightley in the parish of Chittlehampton, which he made his seat and where his descendants lived for many generations having adopted "de Brightley" as their surname in lieu of "FitzWarin".

== Sources ==
- White, Graeme J. (2004). Restoration and Reform, 1153–1165: Recovery from Civil War in England. Cambridge University Press.
