= Fulk FitzWarin =

English lord (died c. 1258)

Arms of FitzWarin: Quarterly per fess indented argent and gules

Fulk FitzWarin (c. 1160 – c. 1258), variant spellings (Latinized Fulco filius Garini, Welsh Syr ffwg ap Gwarin), the third (Fulk III), was a prominent representative of a marcher family associated especially with estates in Shropshire (on the English border with Wales) and at Alveston in Gloucestershire. In young life (c. 1200 – 1203), early in the reign of King John (1199–1216), he won notoriety as the outlawed leader of a roving force striving to recover his familial right to Whittington Castle in Shropshire, which John had granted away to a Welsh claimant. Progressively rehabilitated, and enjoying his lordship, he endured further setbacks in 1215–1217.

Thereafter, his connections with the court of Llywelyn ap Iorwerth and his usefulness to the English king placed him in the midst of a larger conflict in which he lost Whittington to Llywelyn for a year in 1223–1224, though that prince was said to have married his daughter. During the 1220s Fulk founded Alberbury Priory in Shropshire, which became the smallest and last established of the three English houses dependent upon the Order of Grandmont. Always ready to defend his rights, Fulk lived to a ripe old age and was buried at Alberbury beside his two wives, leaving heirs and daughters and a plentiful posterity among whom the name of Fulk FitzWarin was continuously renewed in later centuries. His grandson was Fulk V FitzWarin, 1st Baron FitzWarin (1251–1315).

After his death, Fulk became the subject of a popular "ancestral romance" in French verse, Fouke le Fitz Waryn, relating his life as an outlaw and his struggle to regain his patrimony from the king. This survives in a prose version, and combines historical material with legendary and fantastical elements which are heroic rather than strictly biographical.

== Origins ==
Although the name Fitz Warin means "son of Warin", it was Fulk's grandfather, Fulk I FitzWarin, whose father's name was Warin, or Guarine, of Metz, in Lorraine. Warin (who appears in the Romance of Fouke le Fitz Waryn as "Warin de Meer") is, however, a "shadowy or mythical figure" about whom little is known. Whatever his origin, the head of this family is generally held to have come to England during the reign of William the Conqueror (1066–1087). Neither he nor his sons were then tenants-in-chief (i.e. important vassals or feudal barons): their estates were granted by later kings.

Fulk I was associated with the Peverels: William Peverel the Younger granted him a knight's fee in Tadlow, Cambridgeshire, before 1148 which King Henry II confirmed in 1154. Henry rewarded Fulk I for his support of the Empress Matilda during the civil war by conferring upon him the royal manor of Alveston in Gloucestershire (by 1155) and the manor of Whadborough in Loddington, Leicestershire. His son Fulk II held those properties after the death of his father in 1171. In the time of Robert Foliot, Bishop of Hereford (1174–1186), Fulk II gave land at Tadlow to Shrewsbury Abbey to settle a controversy over the patronage of the church of Alberbury, Shropshire, in his own favour. The FitzWarin land tenure at Alberbury, held from the Fee of Caus, was therefore presumably already in place.

At some time before 1178 Fulk II married Hawise, one of the two daughters and co-heirs of Josce de Dinan and his wife Sybil, widow of Pain fitzJohn. Josce had held Ludlow Castle in the Welsh Marches for the Empress Matilda during the civil war, but it was not expedient for Henry II to confirm Ludlow to Josce, and in place thereof, he granted to him the large manorial estate of Lambourn in Berkshire, with its appurtenances, amounting to a considerable value. Josce died by 1167, and Lambourn became the inheritance, in two parts, of his daughters Hawise and Sybil (who married Hugo de Plugenet). Fulk II and Hawise de Dinan were the parents of Fulk FitzWarin III.

=== How John and Fulk came to blows ===
The FitzWaryn Romance tells that Fulk II and Hawise lived in proximity to the king, and had sons Fulk, William, Philip, John and Alan (who appear as real historical persons in contemporary records). It further states that young Fulk was bred with the four sons of King Henry, who all loved him except for Prince John (born 1166): Fouke le jeouene fust norry ou les iiij. fitz Henré le roy, et mout amé de tous, estre de Johan... The story goes that Fulk and John quarrelled over a game of chess: John struck Fulk over the head with the chessboard, whereat Fulk's foot made a connection with the prince's abdomen, and John fell back, banging his head against the wall. John went off to tell his father, who had him beaten for complaining.

This merry episode reflects a truth, for John was brought up under the tutelage of Ranulf de Glanvill (who became King Henry's Chief Justiciar in 1180), as were Ranulf's nephews Hubert Walter and Theobald Walter, with whom (and with Ranulf's grandson Robert de Auberville), Fulk III later became closely connected by marriage. The milieus of the English royal court and the princely courts of Wales are never far distant from Fulk's story.

== Career ==
=== The lordship of Whittington ===
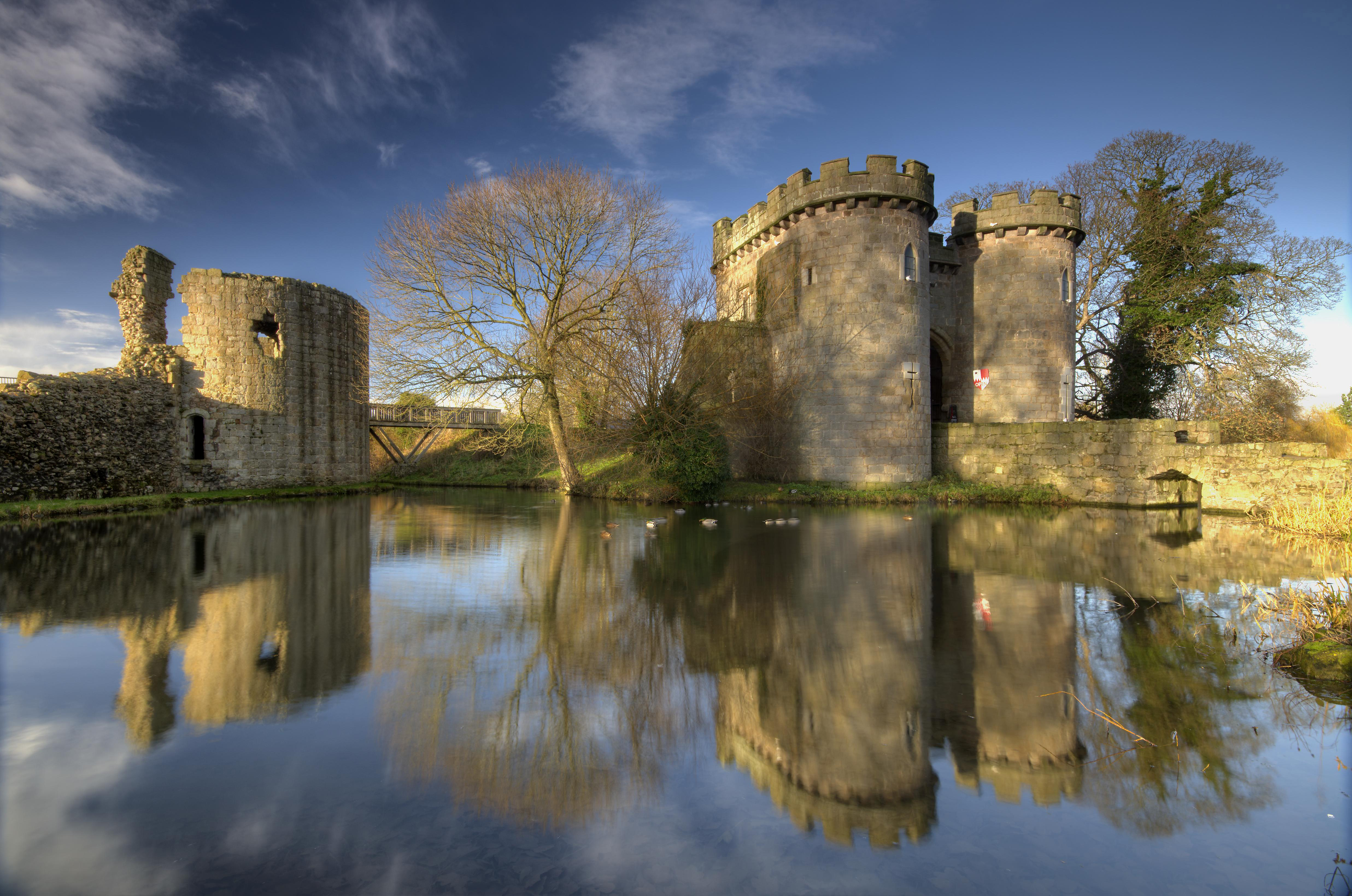
Whittington Castle gatehouse

Fulk II encountered many problems in receiving his capital patrimony and other claimed lands. Among the latter was Whittington Castle, a site north-east of Oswestry which had been fortified by William Peverel the younger in 1138 in support of Empress Matilda. Fulk I, it is supposed, had held this from the Honour of Peverel. The Castle stands on the English (eastern) side of Offa's Dyke, the ancient boundary between England and Wales. During the late 1140s the lordship of Whittington, as with Oswestry and Overton, was ceded from English authority and became a Welsh marcher lordship within the Kingdom of Powys.

In 1165 Henry II granted the castle of Whittington to Roger de Powys, a Welsh leader, and in about 1173 gave him funds for its repair. Fulk II successfully claimed for the restitution of Whittington, a judgement mentioned in the Pipe Roll for 1195 when he owed a Fine of 40 marks to have seisin: but he never paid this, and was dead by 1197. It, therefore, remained in Welsh hands. Fulk III then renewed his father's claim, and in 1197 offered relief of £100 for it as his inheritance. However, on 11 April 1200 King John granted it to Meurig (Maurice), son of Roger of Powis, who had offered half that sum. Again, after Maurice's death in August 1200, King John granted it to Maurice's son Werennoc.

=== Rebellion and outlawry ===
Whether John's refusal to honour Fulk's hereditary claim to Whittington was personal or political, it was this which by April 1201 drove Fulk openly into armed defiance of the king. He was accompanied by approximately fifty-two followers including his brothers William, Phillip and John, by his cousins, and by the family's many tenants and allies in the Marches. Although it is an important element in the Romance of Fouke, the uprising is not described in detail by more formal chroniclers.

It was sufficiently troublesome, however, that when in the spring of 1201 King John crossed into Normandy and Poitou to suppress a revolt by the Lusignans, he assigned 100 knights to Hubert de Burgh with instructions for him to put down the activities of Fulk and his band, and those of a renegade in Devon. The Annales Cestrienses tell that in 1202 Fulk was obliged to make his escape by sea, and, having got away with a few of his followers, took refuge in Stanley Abbey near Chippenham, Wiltshire. There he was besieged by the king's forces, after which Archbishop Hubert Walter with a number of the clergy got him away and kept him for some time in his court. Then Fulk set off quietly with many armed men to join the king of France.

Pardons were granted during that year for Eustace de Kivilly and Gilbert de Duure, for having been associated with him. Fulk himself seems to have had difficulty coming to terms with the king, for in 1203 there are three separate safe-conducts for him and his company to attend and leave the royal presence. In November 1203 he was pardoned together with over thirty of his followers. In October 1204, by a fine of 200 marks, Fulk at last received "right and inheritance" in Whittington. The castle thereafter descended in the FitzWarin family, all subsequent holders being named Fulk, until the death of Fulk (XI), the 7th Baron FitzWarin, in 1420.

=== The first marriage ===
By 1207 Fulk III married Maud (Matilda), daughter and heir of Robert le Vavasour, and widow of Theobald Walter, 1st Chief Butler of Ireland, who died late in 1205 in Ireland. Theobald (of Warrington), who was granted his Irish office in 1185 in service to Prince John's Lordship of Ireland, assisted his brother Hubert Walter in receiving the surrender of John's supporters in Lancaster in 1194. John, after his accession to the throne in 1199, in 1200 deprived Theobald of his lands and offices and did not restore them to him until 1202. His children included the second Theobald.

Maud's dower included one-third of the lands Theobald had held from the king in Ireland, as well as of those in Norfolk and Lancashire: which were released immediately, but a dower from Theobald's lands in Amounderness was in the king's hand in 1215. For the huge fine of 1,200 marks levied upon Fulk for this marriage he secured pledges from his brother William and from Maud's father, a tenant of the feudal barony of Skipton in Yorkshire. The high regard in which Fulk was then held is shown by the names of his sureties, which included the Peverels, Alan Basset, William de Braose (died 1230), a de Lacy, William Longespée, 3rd Earl of Salisbury and Henry de Bohun, 1st Earl of Hereford. In 1210 he accompanied the king to Ireland, and was at Dublin and Carrickfergus. In 1213 the king granted timbers from Leicester Forest to Fulk for his dwelling at the Vavasour hereditament of Narborough, Leicestershire, and for the construction of a chamber there.

On 9 February 1214, when King John again set sail for Poitou, Fulk was among the barons who accompanied him. He is believed to have been a vassal of Geoffrey de Mandeville, Earl of Gloucester at that time. In September of that year Fulk, Walter de Lacy and many others were with King John at Parthenay, to witness John's 5-year peace treaty with King Philip Augustus of France. Over the months immediately following he is found among the malcontent barons who, between their meetings at Bury St Edmunds in November and at the New Temple in January, sought to bring John to a realization of their grievances. By December 1215 Fulk's name appears in the list of English barons excommunicated by Pope Innocent III's bull, for his part in their opposition to the king.

=== Further confrontations ===
In 1215 Fulk was one of many giving great trouble to the Sheriff of Shropshire. Before the accession of the infant king Henry III (John's son) in 1216, Fulk's manor of Alveston had already been seized by the crown: in the following year (1217) all of his other lands in Gloucestershire were likewise seized. By 1218, however, Fulk had made peace and his lands were ordered to be restored to him by the king's regents: his market at his manor of Narborough was withdrawn from him as being "a manifest enemy" of the king's in 1217, but was regranted in 1218, and the Amounderness dower was also restored. In the latter year the king also granted a fair for his manor of Lambourn in Berkshire, the inheritance from Josce de Dinant. Fulk's mother Hawise died at about this time.

By 1220 Fulk had regained some favour with the young King Henry III and had been allowed to rebuild and fortify Whittington, and to hold a weekly market and annual two-day fair there. In 1223 Whittington Castle fell to Llywelyn the Great, Prince of Wales, but was recovered and restored to him, as Kinnerley was restored to Fulk's kinsman Baldwin de Hodenet. However his disputes with Llywelyn continued and more of Fulk's lands fell into the king's hands. During the 1220s Fulk hoped to marry his son Fulk to Anghared, daughter of prince Madog ap Griffin, a union which Llywelyn sought to prevent. By 1228 a truce seems to have been reached between Fulk, Thomas Corbet and Llywelyn, following the intervention of the king.

Throughout these years Fulk's relations with the king were changeable and seemed to be directly dependent on the state of affairs in Wales. As a marcher lord, Fulk's role as a protector of the English border against the Welsh was vital to the English King. He arbitrated several border disputes on behalf of the king and although there were more personal disagreements, there were no more rebellions on the part of Fulk III.

=== Alberbury Priory ===
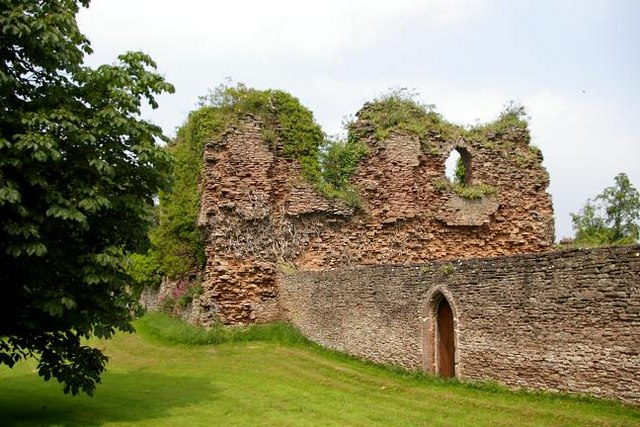
Alberbury Castle, probably built for Fulk III

Between 1221 and 1226 Fulk began to build his priory at Alberbury on a moated site at a bend in the river Severn on the border of England and Wales. He first intended it as a house of Augustinian canons following the Arrouasian rule, and invited Alan, the Abbot of Lilleshall, to establish the convent. However his endowments were found insufficient, and Alan's successor Abbot William renounced any interest in the project. Fulk, therefore, turned instead to the Grandmontine Order, following the example of Walter de Lacy's house founded at Craswall Priory in Herefordshire c. 1220–1225, but placing Alberbury under the immediate authority of Grandmont Abbey in Limousin. Having been intended for the Augustinians, the buildings lacked the special features of a Grandmontine plan. In addition to the priory site with its lands and rights in Alberbury with Pecknall, a fishery in the Severn, and the right to construct mills, Fulk's endowments to the priory included his manor of Whadborough at Loddington in eastern Leicestershire. These were confirmed by King Henry III's charter of 1232. The Castle in Alberbury, of which a ruin remains, is also attributed to Fulk III as representing the seat of his manor here.

=== Estates and suits ===
Narborough, Leicestershire

In 1226 Maud the wife of Fulk FitzWarin died, which was no doubt a stimulus to the completion of the priory, where she was buried. In that year Theobald Walter the younger (son of Maud's first marriage) unsuccessfully challenged William Pantolf and Hawise his wife (Fulk's daughter) for title to the manor of Narborough in Leicestershire, a Vavasour hereditament. Fulke's market at Narborough had received the king's re-confirmation in 1220, but a suit of 1276 shows that the manor had been given by Maud to her daughter Hawise, who by her marriage to Pantolf became Lady of the barony of Wem, as the FitzWarin Romance reminds us. Theobald simultaneously challenged Fulk for the manor of Edlington in Yorkshire, another part of the same inheritance. After Pantolf died in 1233, and Fulk paid 600 marks for custody of his heirs and lands, Hawise remarried to Hubert Husse, taking Narborough as her maritagium with her, and in 1235 Hubert obtained a renewal of the market, which had by then lapsed.

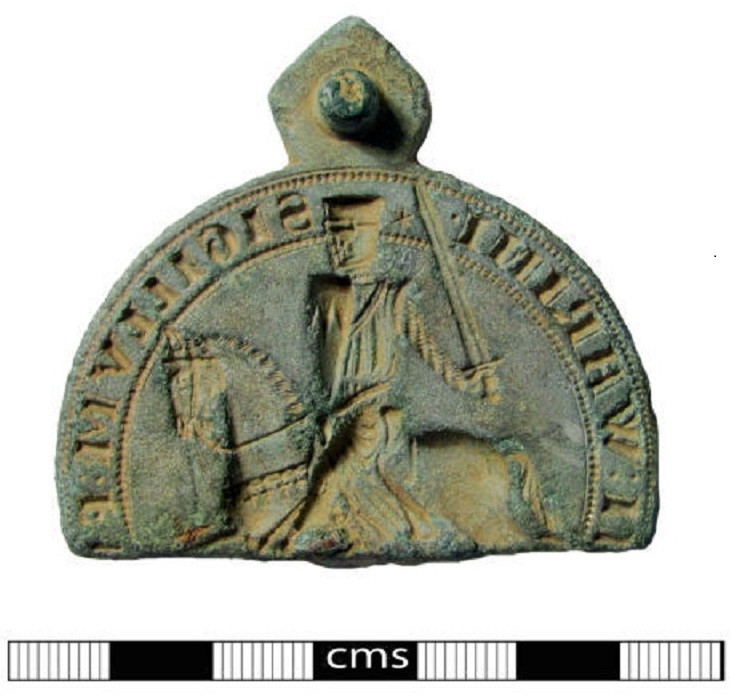
Seal-matrix of Fulk Fitz-Warin (1st half of 13th century), found near Lambourn

Lambourn and Wantage, Berkshire

In 1227 the fair at Lambourn was re-granted. Before 1224 William Marshal, Earl of Pembroke had by his charter enfeoffed Fulk III in the nearby manor of Wantage, Berkshire and in the Hundred of Wantage and Gamenefeud: for although the king's attorney later challenged the FitzWarin right to the Hundreds, they remained in their hands. The king claimed Wantage manor against him as terra Flandrensium—the land of Robert de Béthune—in 1236–37, but Fulk's possession of it was warranted by Gilbert Marshal, and he defended his possession again in 1241 against Robert de Béthune in his own person.

In due course, Fulk by charter granted his entire manor of Lambourn to his daughter Mabil and to the heirs of her body, and acknowledged the fact before the Court of King's Bench in 1249. A seal-matrix of Fulk FitzWarin (equestrian) found at Little Bedwyn, Wiltshire, about five miles south of Lambourn, corresponds to a seal-impression on a charter in the Harleian collection which is dated probably early in the reign of Henry III, and therefore likely to represent Fulk III: another FitzWarin charter with armorial seal, dated 1258, grants land and rent at Wantage.

=== The second marriage ===
Mabil was the daughter of Fulk's second wife, Clarice de Auberville, who (as the Fine rolls record) was certainly living in 1250. The marriage features in the Romance narrative (which calls her "une molt gentile dame") and is said to have occurred "a good while" after the death of Maud. The legend tells that after their marriage Fulk was struck blind for the last seven years of his life, and that he outlived Clarice by one year. It has been accepted (or asserted) that Clarice was the daughter (rather than the widow) of Sir Robert de Auberville, of Iden and Iham (Higham, in Icklesham), near Winchelsea, Sussex. Sir Robert, of an influential Norman family seated at Westenhanger, Kent, was a grandson of Ranulf de Glanvill's, and on the death of his father William de Auberville, c. 1195, had become a ward of Hubert Walter's. He was a Constable of Hastings Castle, and Keeper of the Coast in 1228–1229. Robert's wife Clarice was daughter of Robert and granddaughter of Samson de Gestling, benefactors of Robertsbridge Abbey. Robert de Auberville is supposed to have died c. 1230.

In 1230 Fulk commenced a suit against Philip de Burwardsley (i.e. of Broseley, Shropshire), apparently a FitzWarin cousin, concerning lands in Shropshire and Staffordshire which had been disputed between their grandfathers, and which did not come to a full Assize until after 1233.

=== Service ===
Fulk attended the king's court in Westminster in October 1229: he received a writ of protection during absence upon foreign service in April 1230, and was required to supply one knight for foreign service in aid of the "Earl of Bretaigne" in May 1234. In July 1236 he was appointed one of the Arbitrators (for North Wales) of the truce between King Henry and Llywelyn, as William FitzWarin was among those for South Wales. In March 1238 he was among the powerful men summoned by the king to Oxford, to deliberate upon Llywelyn's action in causing his son Dafydd to receive homage from the magnates of Gwynedd and Powys. The Romance narrative tells that, after the death of Joan, Lady of Snowdon in 1237 (who was buried at Beaumaris), Llywelyn ap Iorwerth took Eva, daughter of Fulk, as his last wife (with which the Annales Cestrienses concur): and, after Llywelyn's death in 1240, she remarried to William de Blancmouster (de Whitchurch).

In June 1245, faced by the rapacity of the Papal nuncio Martin (resulting in a prohibition of tournaments), an assembly of nobles at Dunstable and Linton deputed Fulk to proceed to London to order Martin out of the kingdom. As Matthew Paris relates their interview, Fulk told him to leave England immediately, but Martin questioned his authority to demand it. Fulk told him to be off within three days if he did not wish to be utterly brought down, and withdrew in anger, heaping threats upon threats with a terrible oath against him. Martin hurried off to the king, who told him that he had brought the kingdom to the brink of revolt: being asked for safe conduct the king answered, "May the Devil take you to hell." A week later Fulk witnessed a charter of the king's at Windsor.

=== Last controversies ===
Although Fulk seems certainly to have lived after 1250, in this late period it is increasingly difficult to distinguish him from his two sons named Fulk, among the various references to Fulk "senior" and "junior". At a Shropshire Assize of January 1256, Fulk "junior" (possibly the younger son called Fulk Glas) was claiming that Thomas Corbet had disseised him of his free tenement of Alberbury. At an earlier hearing, he had become enraged when Corbet referred to his father as "Proditor" (Traitor), and had renounced any homage he had made to Corbet, vowing never to hold land of him again. The court found for FitzWarin, but Corbet later brought an appeal.

The Hundred Rolls for 1255 show that Fulk FitzWarin was then holding two hides geldable in Alberbury of the fee of Caus (of which Thomas Corbet of Caus Castle was lord), and that the Grandmontensian brothers there held two virgates by the gift of Fulk FitzWarin senior (i.e. Fulk III in 1232), and of the fee of Caus. The services owing by Fulk FitzWarin for a knight's fee held from Corbet at Alberbury had been set forth in a concord of 1248, the Fine for which was recorded in the Great Roll of the Pipe for 1250 and remained unpaid in 1252.

In 1245 the king had appointed Fulk FitzWarin, John le Strange and Henry de Audley to settle a land dispute between Gruffydd ap Madog, whose land had been seized by Dafydd ap Llywelyn during the king's last war, and which had been seized back from Dafydd and was now claimed by Gruffydd ap Gwenwynwyn (whose mother was Margaret Corbet, and whose wife Hawise was daughter of John le Strange of Knockin Castle). On the occasion of Thomas Corbet's outrageous remark, the court had been meeting by royal precept to settle contentions between Corbet and Gruffydd ap Gwenwynwyn. In time, Gruffydd's daughter Margaret became the wife of Fulk V FitzWarin, son of Fulk IV.

=== Death and burial ===
Historians cannot exactly state when FitzWarin died but 1258 is given as the latest probable date. Most likely, he handed some of his affairs over to his son Fulk IV during his lifetime. According to the Romance narrative, his second wife Clarice died before him. She was buried at Alberbury Priory, and he died a year later and was laid to rest beside both of his wives in the monastery church, part of which was incorporated into later buildings at the site.

== Family ==
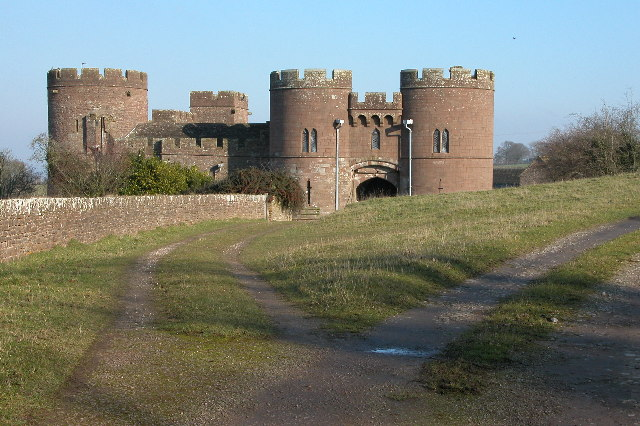
Pembridge Castle (much restored), seat of Sir Henry de Pembridge

Fulk III FitzWarin married, first, c. 1207, Maud (Matilda) le Vavasour, daughter of Robert le Vavasour and widow of Theobald Walter. Maud died in 1226 and was buried at Alberbury Priory (alias New Abbey, Alberbury) in Shropshire. Their offspring included:

- Fulk IV FitzWarin (d. 1264). He received the manor of Edlington, Yorkshire, as part of his inheritance. He married Constance de Tosny, and was the father of Fulk V FitzWarin, 1st Baron FitzWarin.
- Hawise FitzWarin, married (first) William Pantulf, a marcher lord (who died in 1233), and (secondly) Hubert Huse. She received the manor of Narborough.
- Joan FitzWarin, married Sir Henry de Penebrugge, of Pembridge Castle, Herefordshire.
- Eleanor FitzWarin, married William de Rivers (de Ripariis) of Great Shefford in the Lambourn valley, Berkshire, son of Richard de Rivers of East Mersea (Essex).
- Eve FitzWarin, married William de Blanchminister. It was claimed in the Romance narrative and in the Annales Cestrienses that she first married Llywelyn ap Iorwerth.
- Fulk Glas (sometimes attributed to his father's second marriage)

Fulk's second marriage, to Clarice de Auberville, is described in the Romance narrative. Clarice is taken to have been the daughter and heiress of Robert de Auberville of Iden and Iham (Higham, in Icklesham), Sussex, and his wife Clarice de Gestling. Fulk's daughter by this marriage was:

- Mabel FitzWarin (d. 1297), who married (first) William de Crevequer (no issue) and (secondly) John Tregoz, Lord Tregoz (died before 6 September 1300). By the second marriage she had two daughters and co-heirs, Clarice and Sybil Tregoz. She received the manor of Lambourn.

Sir William Dugdale, in his Baronage, accepted as factual the identification of Clarice as the second wife of Fulk III and, despite occasional doubts, later accounts of the family have followed this precedent.

== Romance ==
During the later 13th century, when the actual events of Fulk's life were still in living memory or common report, a romance known as Fouke le Fitz Waryn, probably first in French verse, was written about him. This survives in an early 14th-century French prose version, in a single manuscript in the Royal manuscripts, British Library, which is thought to follow the lost verse quite closely. The 16th-century antiquary John Leland saw and briefly described the French verse version, and made an extended abstract from a Middle English verse version called The Nobile Actes of the Guarines, the original of which is also lost. Various contemporary references show that the tale was widely-known in the later Middle Ages.
