= Cardeston =

Settlement in Shropshire, England

Coordinates: 52.705°N 2.896°W

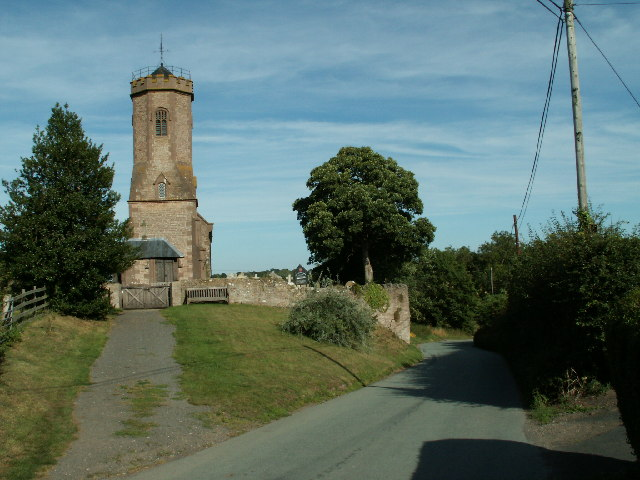
- St. Michael's church at Cardeston

- Location within Shropshire
- OS grid reference: SJ394123
- Civil parish: Alberbury with Cardeston
- Unitary authority: Shropshire
- Ceremonial county: Shropshire
- Region: West Midlands
- Country: England
- Sovereign state: United Kingdom
- Post town: SHREWSBURY
- Postcode district: SY5
- Dialling code: 01743
- Police: West Mercia
- Fire: Shropshire
- Ambulance: West Midlands
- UK Parliament: Shrewsbury and Atcham

Cardeston is a small settlement in the civil parish of Alberbury with Cardeston, in Shropshire, England. It is near the A458 road and is 11 miles (18 km) west of Shrewsbury. It has no facilities, apart from a Church of England church. In 1881 the civil parish had a population of 275. On 25 March 1886 the parish was abolished to form "Alberbury with Cardeston".

== See also ==
- Listed buildings in Alberbury with Cardeston
