= Alberbury with Cardeston =

Civil parish in Shropshire, England

Coordinates: 52.715°N 2.901°W

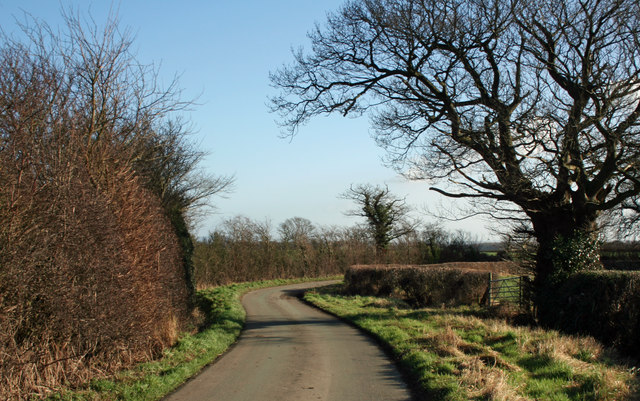
- Near Wollaston and the Welsh border in the parish of Alberbury with Cardeston.

- Location within Shropshire
- Population: 1,011 (2011)
- OS grid reference: SJ391134
- Civil parish: Alberbury with Cardeston
- Unitary authority: Shropshire
- Ceremonial county: Shropshire
- Region: West Midlands
- Country: England
- Sovereign state: United Kingdom
- Post town: Shrewsbury
- Postcode district: SY5
- Police: West Mercia
- Fire: Shropshire
- Ambulance: West Midlands
- UK Parliament: Shrewsbury and Atcham

Alberbury with Cardeston is a civil parish in Shropshire, England. According to the 2001 census it had a population of 645 (though in 2005 the parish expanded with the annexation of half of the former Wollaston parish), increasing to 1,011 at the 2011 Census. It includes the villages and hamlets of Alberbury, Cardeston, Little Shrawardine, Wollaston, Halfway House, Wattlesborough Heath and Rowton, and has Alberbury Castle and Wattlesborough Castle within its borders. To the west the parish borders Wales, whilst to the north it is bounded by the River Severn.

== See also ==
- Listed buildings in Alberbury with Cardeston
