= Loton Park Hill Climb =

Motorsport venue in Shropshire, England

Coordinates: 52°43′23.71″N 2°57′0.11″W

Loton Park
- Location: Loton Park, Shropshire, England
- Time zone: GMT
- Major Events: British Hill Climb Championship
- Hill Length: 1,475 yards (1,349 m)
- Hill Record: 41.76 (Wallace Menzies, 2021, British Hill Climb Championship)

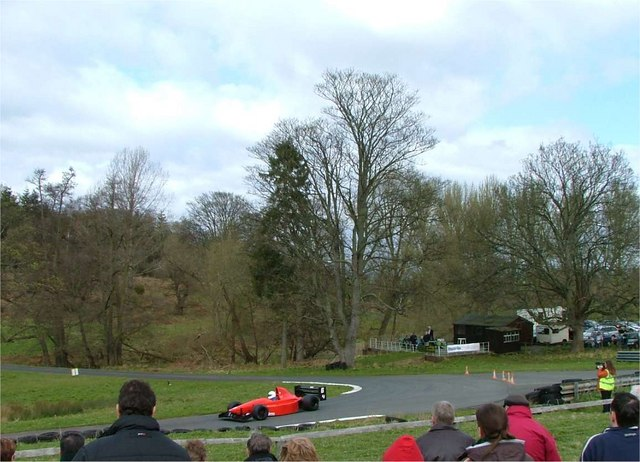

Loton Park Hill Climb is a hillclimb held in part of the Loton Park deer park just outside the village of Alberbury in Shropshire, England. The track was originally constructed by the members of The Severn Valley Motor Club based in Shrewsbury, in the mid-1950s. The first ever winner was Peter Foulkes in a Cooper Climax. The track was threatened with closure in 1969 and since then events have been organised by the Hagley & District Light Car Club, who obtained the lease on the land from owner Sir Michael Leighton in 1970, in which year the first National A hillclimb was staged.

The course is 1475 yards (1349 metres) in length, making it the third longest course used in the British Hill Climb Championship. It contains an unusual downhill section fairly early in its layout. The hill record of 41.76 seconds was set by Wallace Menzies on 26 September 2021.

== Loton Park Hill Climb past winners ==
Year	Driver	Vehicle	Time	Notes
1960				Sept 3.
1961	M. Hatton	Cooper 1,100 c.c.	35.68 sec	
1961	M. Hatton	Cooper	33.95 sec R	July 22.
1963	Round 1 : Tony Marsh	Marsh-Climax 1½-litre S/C	37.03 sec	April 27, lengthened 900-yard course.
1964	Round 1 : Peter Westbury	Ferguson-Climax P99 2½-litre	35.56 sec	April 25/26.
1965	Round 1 : Tony Marsh	Marsh-Special Oldsmobile		
1967	Round 1 : Bryan Eccles	Brabham BT18-Oldsmobile V8		
1968				Sept 1.
1969	Round 1 : David Hepworth	Hepworth FF		
1973	Round 1 : Sir Nicholas Williamson	Marlyn 712-DFV		
1973	Roy Lane	McLaren M14D	54.72 sec R	
1979	Martyn Griffiths	Pilbeam MP40 2.2-litre	50.81 sec R	July 1.
2006	Round 1 : Scott Moran	Gould-NME GR61X 3.5-litre	46.54 sec	April 7.
2006	Round 2 : Roger Moran	Gould-NME GR61X 3.5-litre	46.34 sec	April 7.
2006	Round 13 : Scott Moran	Gould-NME GR61X 3.5-litre	45.94 sec	June 11.
2006	Round 14 : Martin Groves	Gould-NME GR55	45.45 sec	June 11.
2009	Round 13 : Scott Moran	Gould-NME GR61X 3.5-litre	44.72 sec	June 13–14.
2009	Round 14 : Scott Moran	Gould-NME GR61X 3.5-litre	44.78 sec	June 13–14.
2010	Round 9 : Roger Moran	Gould-NME GR61X 3.5-litre	45.36 sec	June 13.
2010	Round 10 : Trevor Willis	OMS-Powertec 2.8-litre	58.72 sec	June 13.
2010	Round 33 : Scott Moran	Gould-NME GR61X 3.5-litre	44.62 sec FTD	Sept 26.
2010	Round 34 : Martin Groves	Gould-NME GR55B 3.5-litre	44.73 sec	Sept 26.

Key: R = Course Record; FTD = Fastest Time of the Day; S/C = Supercharged.
