= Historia Normannis =

- Founded: 2003
- Location: United Kingdom, Canada, France
- Period: Middle Ages
- Speciality: Combat reenactment, living history, educational visits
- Number of members: 550 +
- Member groups: 35 +
- Website: www.normannis.co.uk

Historia Normannis is a 12th-century reenactment society, primarily based in the UK. It currently has around ~40 active 'cells' across the UK, and a cell group in Brittany, France. The society has an active membership of around 600, making it one of the largest societies in the UK. The group's primary focus is on the period 1135–1215. The society usually hosts a large event in the first weekend in May.

While originating in 2003 as an informal project, Historia Normannis was reformed in 2008 with a formal approach to reenactment, focussing on accuracy.

== Activities ==
The society's members work on a range of displays often either as living history or combat . They work to portray authentic 12th century individuals with different ranks indicating their level in society.

Through the summer months, the society often take part in shows for the general public.

Historia Normannis also takes part in media appearances; In 2015 they featured in Episode 4 of the UKTV series, Weekend Warriors, which followed the group's build-up to their annual event at Whittington Castle in Shropshire.

== Membership ==
The society accepts new members through any of the currently active cell groups in the UK and France. Details about joining can be found on the group's website. Many members are recruited in university as the group often has university-based societies.
