= Loton Park =

Mansion in Alberbury, Shropshire, England

Coordinates: 52°43′23.71″N 2°57′0.11″W

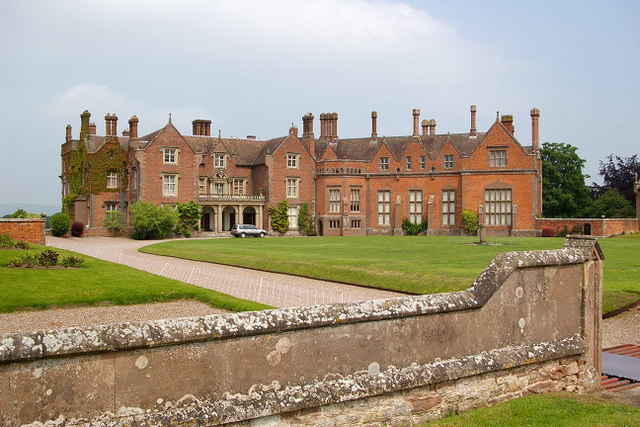
Loton Park

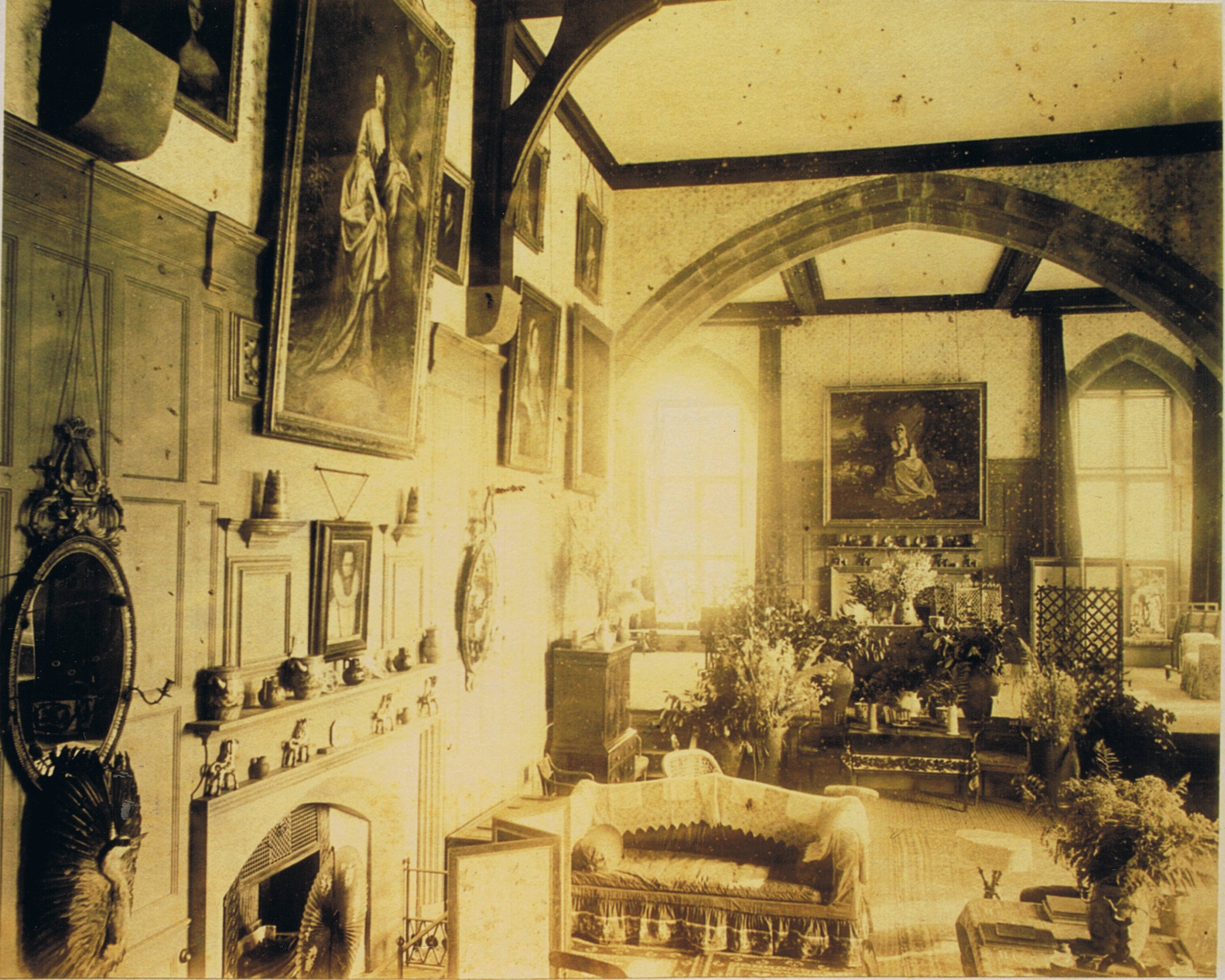
The hall circa 1870. From an album of an uncle and aunt of the Leightons of the day. Showing on the far wall is Sir Joshua Reynolds' Frances Anne Crewe (miss Greville), as St. Genevieve, c1773.

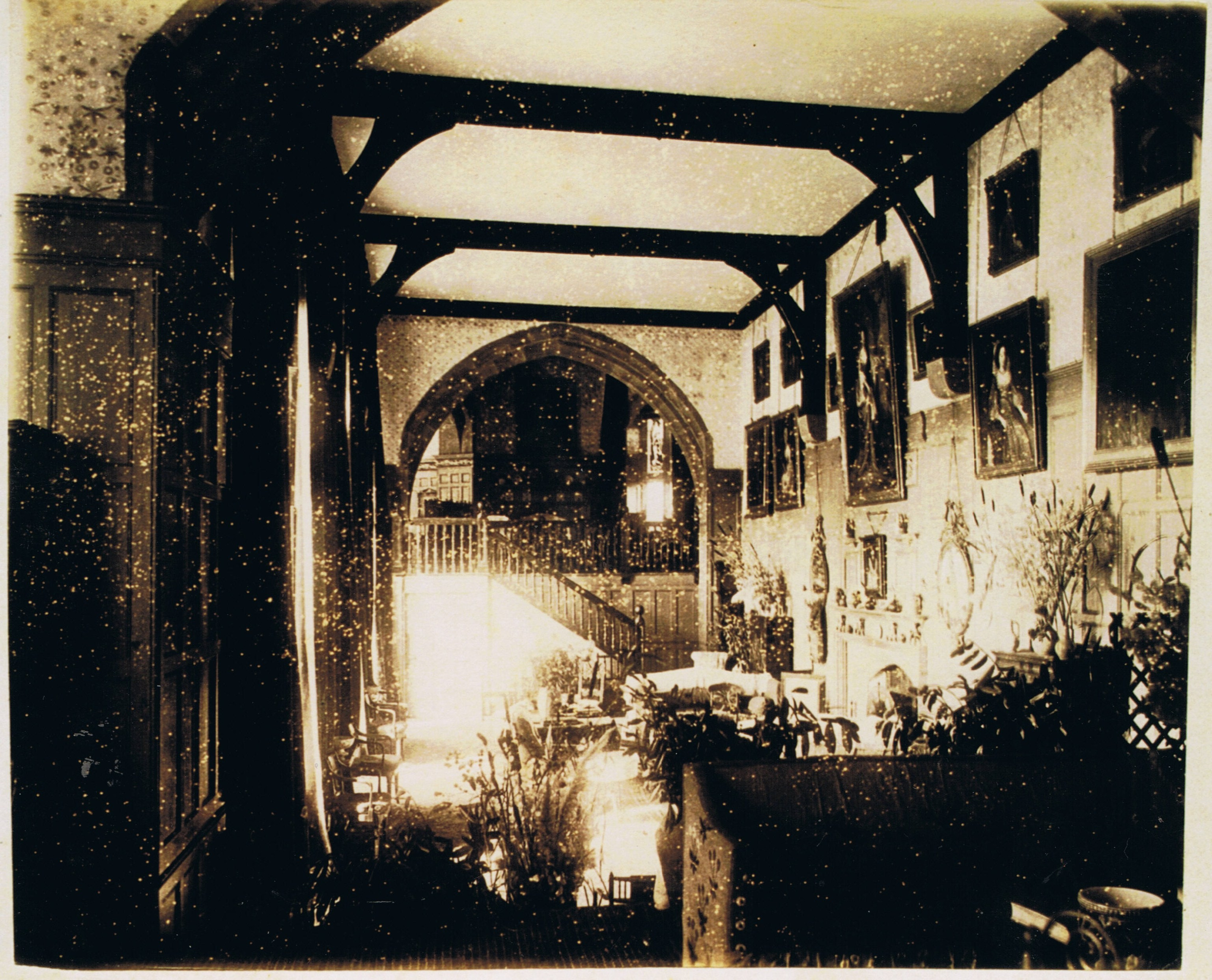
A photograph of the hall, circa 1870.

Loton Park is a country house near Alberbury, Shrewsbury in Shropshire, on the upper reaches of the River Severn. It is a Grade II* listed building. It has been the seat of the Leighton family since 1391.

It stands in 400 acres (1.6 km^{2}) of parkland which includes one of the two privately owned deer parks to remain in Shropshire and is notable for its population of red kites.

== History ==
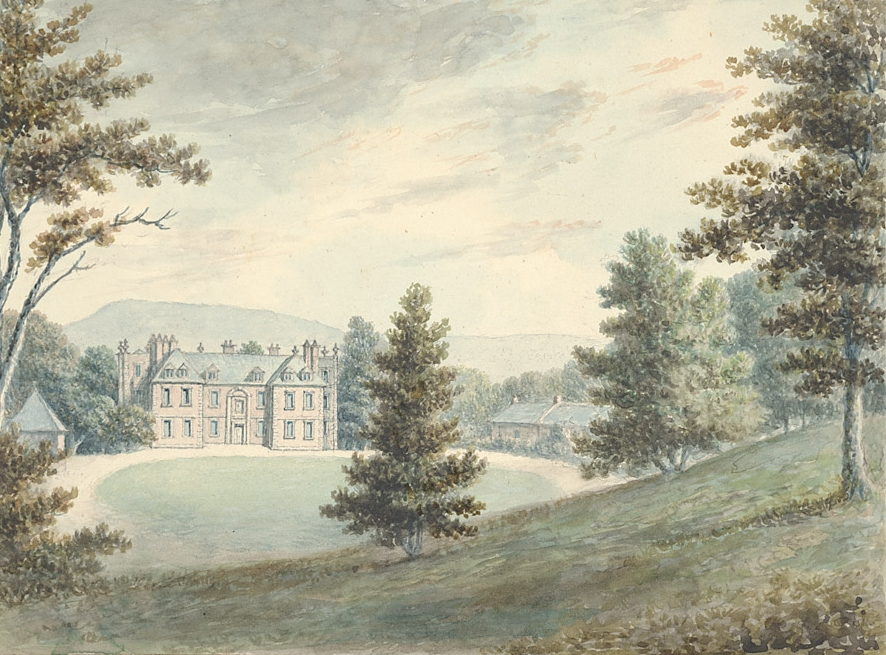
Loton Hall, 1796

The estate is mentioned in the Domesday Book. The core of the present house dates from the 17th century, though significant remodelling was carried out throughout the 19th century. The ruins of an earlier castle, built in 1340, survive in the grounds.

The north front was built in 1712 by Sir Edward Leighton, 2nd Baronet, who moved his family seat here from Wattlesborough Castle, and was High Sheriff of Shropshire for 1727. In 1805, the 5th Baronet entertained the Prince Regent and the Duke of Clarence at Loton. Sir Baldwin Leighton, 6th Baronet was wounded in the American War of Independence, was a Brigadier in Portugal and Governor of Carrickfergus Castle.

The house is currently the home of Sir Michael Leighton, 11th Baronet.

The estate is also prominent in motorsport as the location of the Loton Park Hill Climb.

== Architectural ==
Loton Hall is a Grade II*-listed building, dated c.1670. A country house, originally with a U-shaped plan, a large wing was added to the southeast in 1872–73. The house is built in red brick with dressings in red and grey sandstone and a tile roof. The earlier part has a plinth, quoins, chamfered, coped and parapeted gables with finials. There are two storeys, a basement and attics, and a front of five bays, the outer bays projecting and gabled. In the centre is a three-bay loggia-porch that has arches with imposts, Tuscan columns, an entablature, and a balustrade. Above, the central window has Corinthian columns and a broken triangular pediment containing a cartouche, and above that is a gabled half-dormer. The later wing to the right has one storey with attics, and nine bays, and contains gables, mullioned and transomed windows, and a full-height canted bay window.

== See also ==
- Grade II* listed buildings in Shropshire Council (H–Z)
- Listed buildings in Alberbury with Cardeston
