= Whittington Castle =

Castle in northern Shropshire, England

- Shropshire, England
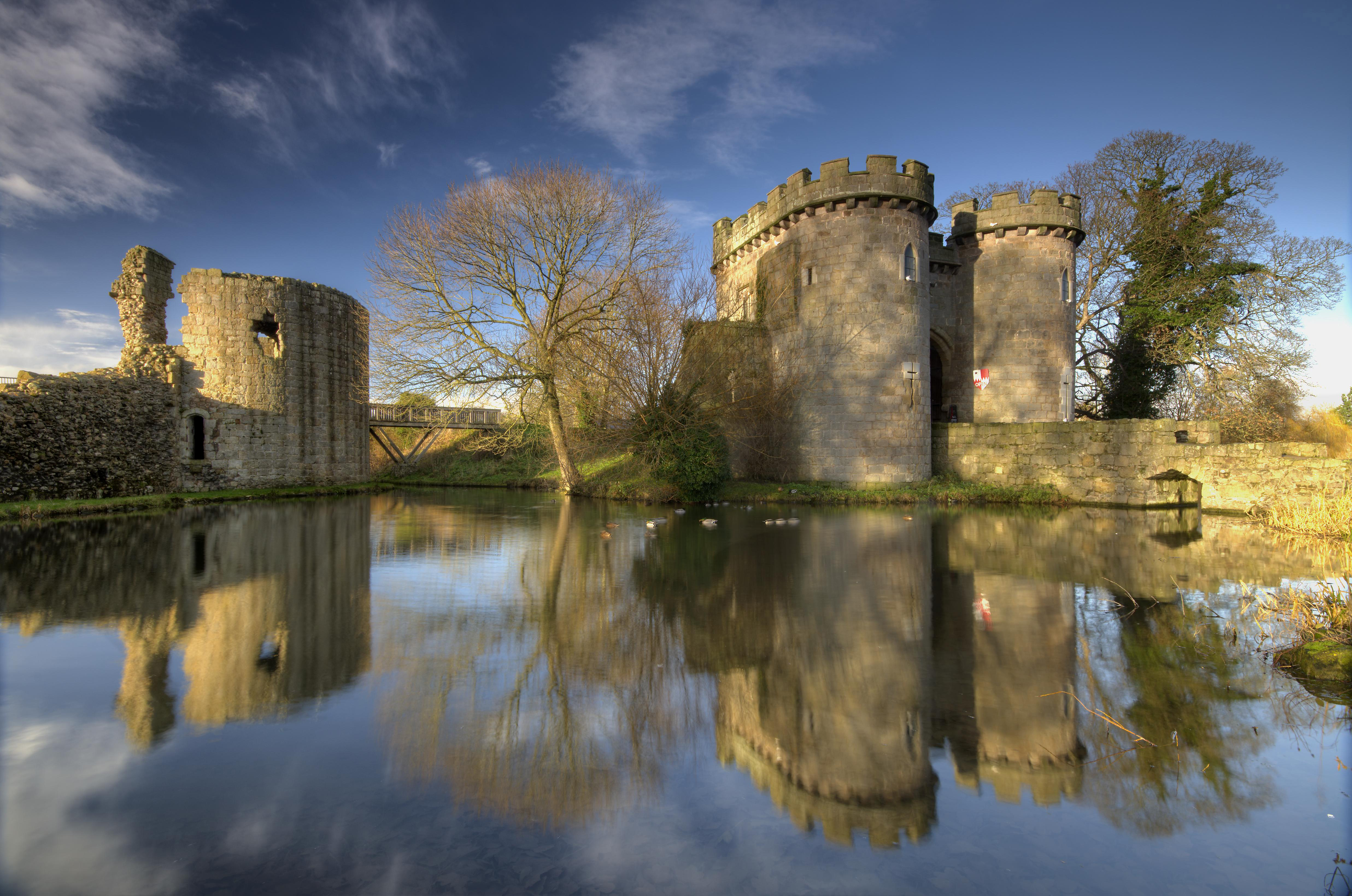
- Whittington Castle in 2016

Site information
- Type: Castle
- Condition: Ruined

Location
- Shown within Shropshire.
- Coordinates: 52.8731°N 3.0043°W
- Grid reference: grid reference SJ325311

Whittington Castle is a castle in northern Shropshire, England. The castle was originally a motte-and-bailey castle, but this was replaced in the 13th century by one with buildings around a courtyard whose exterior wall was the curtain wall of the inner bailey. As a castle of the Welsh Marches, it was built on the border of Wales and England very close to the historic fort of Old Oswestry.

Whittington Castle resides on a 12-acre (49,000 m^{2}) property in the village of Whittington, in the former district of North Shropshire, in the county of Shropshire in England. It abuts Castle Road.

In 2003, a historical and archaeological investigation by Peter Brown and Peter King identified that the outer bailey of the castle had been two elaborate gardens and surrounded by water in the 14th century. This discovery was significant in that it proved the advanced state (as compared to those of the French or Flemish) of English gardening habits. The "lavish" garden was installed by one of the FitzWarin family. The viewing mound in the centre may be the oldest of its type yet discovered in England.

== History ==
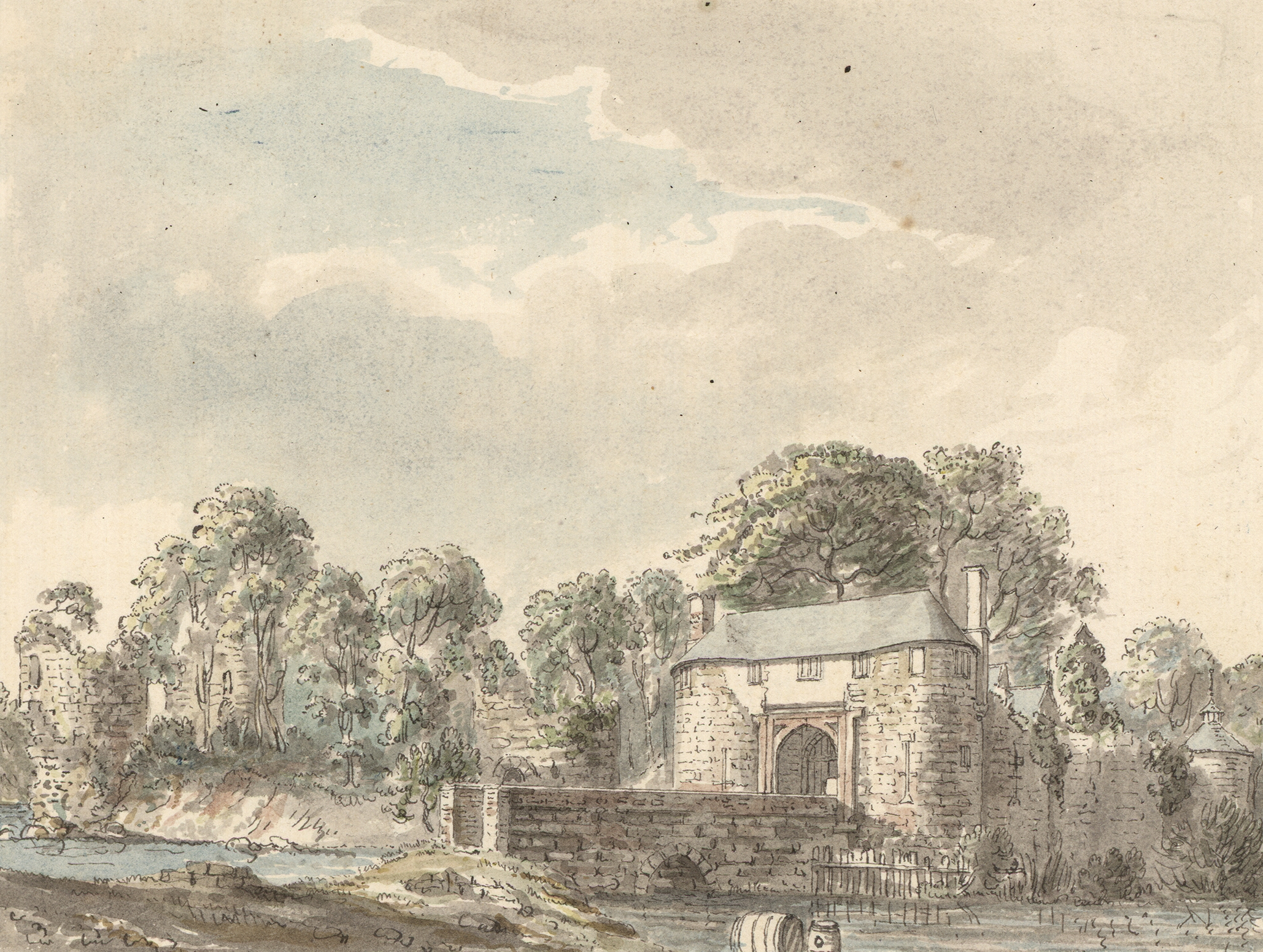
Whittington Castle c. 1778

Whittington lies on the English side of Offa's Dyke, which in this area was the Norman boundary between England and Wales. The castle of Whittington may have begun as a Norman manor house, although there is no evidence for this. The site was fortified as a castle for William Peverel, in 1138, in support of Empress Matilda, the daughter of Henry I against King Stephen, nephew of King Henry I, and claimant to the throne during The Anarchy. In 1149, the lordship of Whittington, like nearby Oswestry, was annexed by Madog ap Maredudd and became part of the Kingdom of Powys until Madog's death in 1160.

In 1165 Henry II conferred the castle on Roger de Powys, to whom he gave funds for its repair in about 1173. Roger was followed by his son Meurig (or Maurice), he was followed by his son Werennoc. A rival claim from Fulk III FitzWarin (who apparently claimed it under the Peverels) was not recognised until 1204, leading him to rebel against King John. FitzWarin was pardoned, and the castle and lordship of Whittington, not including Overton Castle was given to him. The castle then descended in the FitzWarin family, all called Fulk, until the death of Fulk XI in 1420.

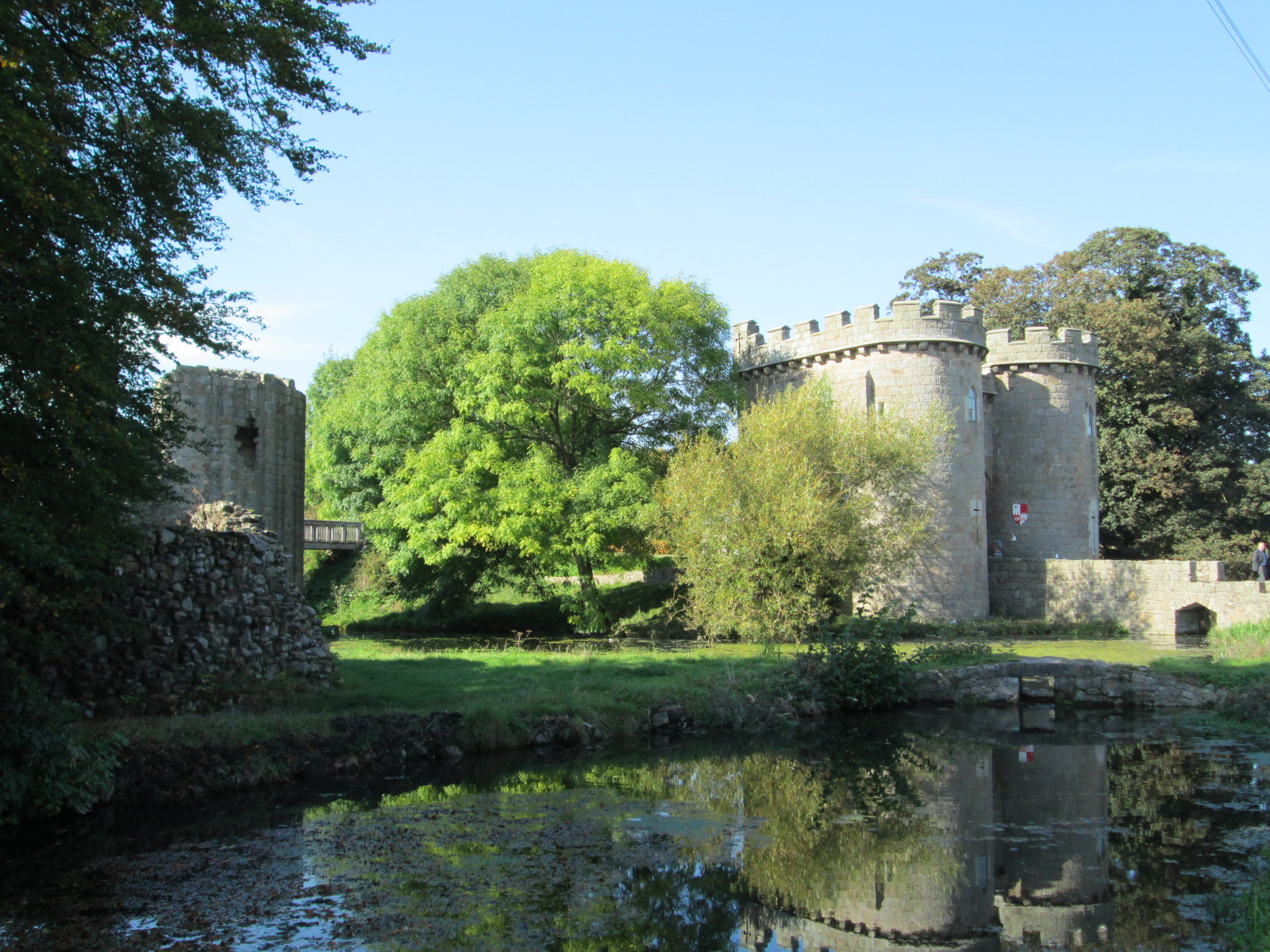
Whittington Castle, October 2014

The castle was captured and destroyed by Llywelyn ab Iorwerth of Gwynedd in 1223. It was returned under the peace treaty, and was rebuilt in stone, replacing the tower keep of a motte and bailey with inner bailey with buildings along a curtain wall and five towers on a raised platform surrounded by a moat, beyond which there is an outer gatehouse or barbican. For the next forty years, the castle remained in English possession, but was ceded to Llywelyn ap Gruffudd by treaty. After the defeat of Llewelyn in 1282, the castle became a lordly residence for the FitzWarin family. However, after the death of Fulk VII in 1349, the castle went through a long period when the lords were almost always under age and usually absentees, though some repairs were carried out in about 1402. The lordship was laid waste in 1404 during the rebellion of Owain Glyndŵr, so that the lordship was worth nothing in 1407. However, the castle was not captured.

It had been occupied during the minority of Fulk XI by his mother and her new husband William Lord Clinton, during whose time there was a dispute with the people of Oswestry who had cut down oak trees in his woods. When the FitzWarin line died out in 1420, the lordship passed to Fulk XI's sister Elizabeth, who married Richard Hankeford. In 1422, the castle was captured by escalade by William Fitzwaryn (presumably a cousin claiming the castle as heir male) and Richard Laken, but evidently soon restored to Lord Clinton.

Their daughter, Thomasia, married William Bourghchier, thus carrying the FitzWarin peerage into the Bourchier family. Their grandson John Bourchier was made Earl of Bath, but his son John Bourchier, 2nd Earl of Bath exchanged the lordship and castle in 1545 with Henry VIII, for some former monastic estates nearer the main family home in Devon.

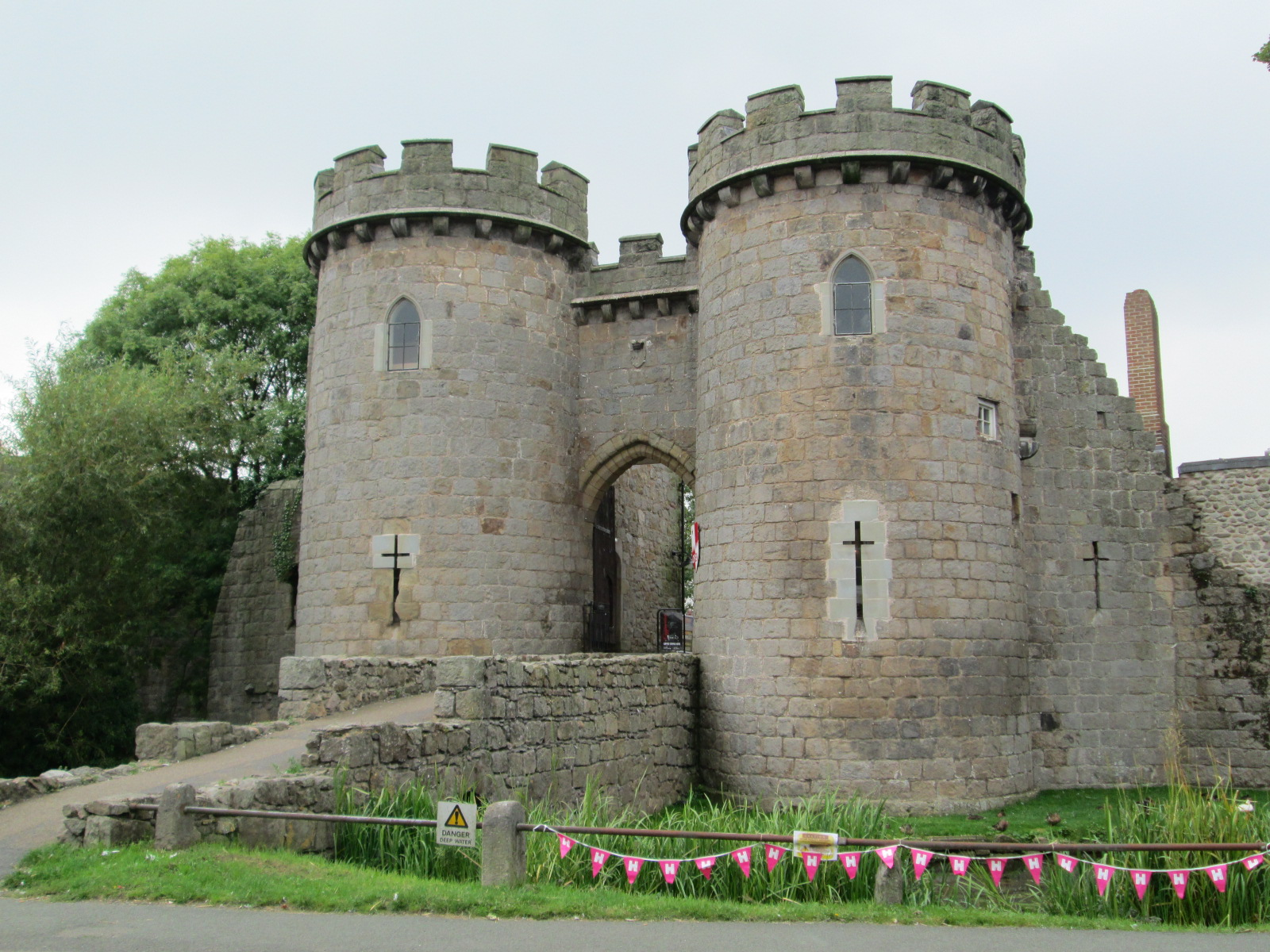
Gatehouse of Whittington Castle

A detailed survey of the castle was made at the time of the exchange. This describes some of the buildings as 'in decay'. The castle itself was probably never inhabited again. It passed through various hands to William Albany, a London merchant taylor, but he and his descendants (from 1750 the Lloyd family of Aston near Oswestry, who still own the castle) lived at Great Fernhill. William's grandson, Francis Albany, fell into debt and sold his wood in Babbinswood to Arthur Kynaston of Shrewsbury, who built a forge at Fernhill, using stone from the castle. In 1632, the Castle Gatehouse was let, the tenant being allowed to take 'freestone out of the castle'. By the time of the English Civil War, Whittington Castle was evidently no longer defensible and there is no evidence that it played any role in that war. In 1673, the castle (or rather the gatehouse) was let as a romantic dwelling to Thomas Lloyd, a London merchant, probably retired. About 1760, one of the towers fell into the moat. This and other parts of the castle were used to make roads, probably including the new turnpike road to Ellesmere in 1776, during the minority of William Lloyd.

== Restoration ==
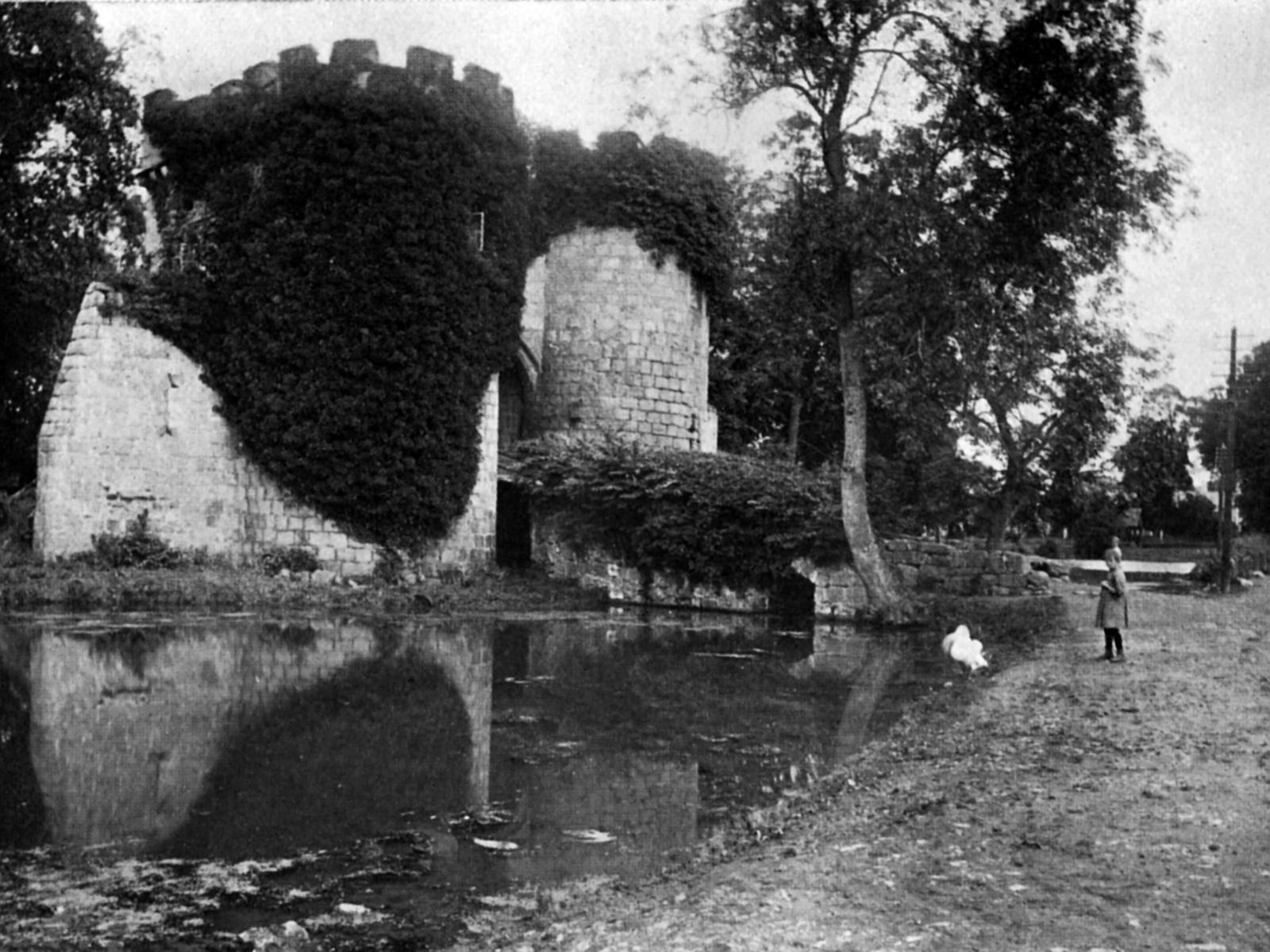
This photograph of Whittington Castle before its recent renovation was published in Thos D. Murphy's work In Unfamiliar England (1910).

The castle fronts onto the old line of the Holyhead Road and was thus noticed by visitors. William Lloyd undertook the restoration of the gatehouse in about 1808, letting it as a farmhouse. This continued to be occupied as a house until the 1990s.

Whittington Castle is currently owned on a 99-year lease from 2002 by the Whittington Castle Preservation Trust, a rural community trust formed in December 1998. The trust recently completed a £1.5 million renovation project.

Every year the Historia Normannis historical re-enactment group gathers at the castle to re-enact battles that would have happened in the area at that time of year.

== Legends ==
One of the most prominent legends concerning Whittington Castle regards the Marian Chalice, thought by some to be the Holy Grail. According to this legend, Sir Fulk FitzWarin, the great grandson of Payne Peveril and one in the line of guardians of the Grail and King Arthur. A story from the 13th century states that the Grail was kept in a private chapel of the castle when Sir Fulk was there. The coat of arms of Fulk FitzWarin is hung above the castle archway.

It is also claimed that the castle formed part of the lordship of a noble Welshman called Tudur Trefor or Tudor Trevor in both the Maelors (that is Maelor Saesneg and Maelor Gymraeg. Though his father Rhys Sais did hold the former, the rest seems to be an invention of Lewis Dwnn in 1846.

- Fitz Warin Romance

== Media ==
Whittington Castle appeared on an episode of Most Haunted on 7 July 2016.

== See also ==
- Grade I listed buildings in Shropshire
- Listed buildings in Whittington, Shropshire
