= Fulk FitzWarin, 1st Baron FitzWarin =

English nobleman in the 13/14th century

Fulk FitzWarin
- 1st Baron FitzWarin
- Arms of the FitzWarin family
- Born: 1251
- Died: 1315 (aged 63–64)
- Noble family: FitzWarin
- Spouse: Margaret verch Gruffydd
- Issue: Fulk FitzWarin, 2nd Baron FitzWarin
- Father: Fulk (IV) FitzWarin

Fulk FitzWarin, 1st Baron FitzWarin (14 September 1251 – 24 November 1315), sometimes styled as Fulk V FitzWarin, was an English landowner and soldier who was created the first Baron FitzWarin in 1295, during the reign of King Edward I.

== Family background ==
The FitzWarin family took its name from Guarine (or Warin) de Meez, said to have been a member of the House of Lorraine who came to England after the Norman Conquest. Fulk FitzWarin, the first baron, was the fifth of his family to bear the name Fulk, though some chronicles conflate two of his ancestors together. His father, Fulk (IV) FitzWarin, was appointed by King Richard I to defend the Welsh Marches, later rebelled against (and was outlawed by) King John, and, having made his peace with King Henry III, drowned in a river during the Battle of Lewes in royal service during the Second Barons' War. His grandfather was Fulk (III) FitzWarin.

== Welsh wars ==
FitzWarin became entangled in the strife between the Welsh princes Gruffydd ap Gwenwynwyn and Llywelyn ap Gruffudd. FitzWarin's father had held the manor of Bausley, which had previously been held by the Corbet family, and which was subsequently taken by Gruffydd ap Gwenwynwyn. When FitzWarin married Gruffydd's daughter, the latter restored the manor to his new son-in-law. During the conflict between the two princes, Llywelyn seized Bausley (along with other lands of Gruffydd), and after he was driven out another of the Corbet family, Peter Corbet of Cans, claimed it. It is not clear whether FitzWarin petitioned King Edward I to decide the issue, or whether the king stepped in to prevent a deadly feud; regardless, the king sent the Earl of Lincoln to resolve the case, which he decided in FitzWarin's favor. Like his father-in-law, FitzWarin sided with the king in the Welsh Wars. For his service, FitzWarin was summoned to Parliament in 1295 as the first Baron FitzWarin.

== Later life ==
FitzWarin continued to serve the crown, fighting in the Scottish Wars and in Flanders. He was made a Knight of the Bath. He died in 1315.

== Marriage and issue ==
FitzWarin married Margaret, daughter of Gruffydd ap Gwenwynwyn, Prince of Powys Wenwynwyn. They had a son, also named Fulk, who succeeded him as Baron FitzWarin. he also had a daughter named Hawise FitzWarin who married Robert Hoo "The Younger" ancestor of Thomas Hoo, Baron Hoo and Hastings

Peerage of England
New creation	Baron FitzWarin; 1295–1315	Succeeded by Fulk FitzWarin
