= Rowton Castle =

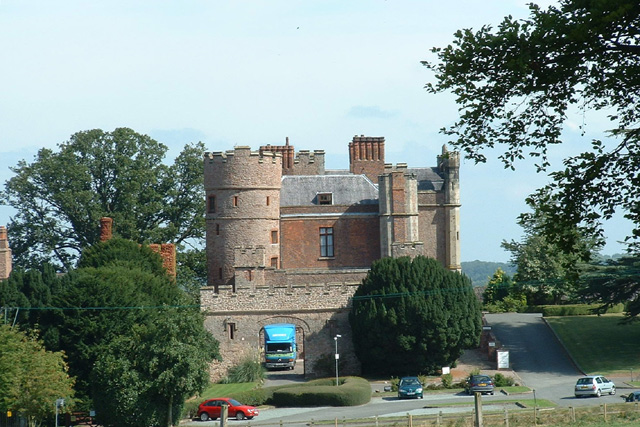
- Rowton Castle

- Location within Shropshire

General information
- Location: Near Shrewsbury, Shropshire, England
- Coordinates: 52.7087°N 2.9207°W
- Completed: 17th century

Rowton Castle, near Shrewsbury, Shropshire, England, is a Grade II* listed country house that was once the home of the Royal National College for the Blind before it moved to its present location in Hereford. This 17th-century castle is surrounded by 17 acres of gardens, and is approximately six miles (9.7 km) from Shrewsbury. It is currently used as a wedding venue, hotel and restaurant.

The present castle was built in the 17th century, although a previous castle had stood on the site for several hundred years. The house was in the possession of the Lyster family until the death of Lady Charlotte Lyster, in 1889. She passed the house to her nephew, Montagu Corry, 1st Baron Rowton, who in turn passed it on to his nephew, Colonel N. A. Lowry Curry following his death in 1903. The house's next owner, Major Lees, sold it to the Royal Normal College for the Blind in 1941. The college, which had previously been located in London, was forced to find new premises after its site, based in Upper Norwood, was bombed during the Blitz, then acquired by the authorities. The college used the castle itself as the accommodation block for staff and senior pupils. The building also housed the dining areas for both junior and senior pupils. Classrooms, which have since been converted into private apartments, were built to the eastern side of the building.

In 1953 a fire destroyed much of the buildings and 38 pianos and organs used for training pupils in tuning. The alarm was raised by one of the students, and everybody present was evacuated to safety. Training was able to continue after Henshaw's Institution for the Blind took students and staff as a temporary measure. As the college expanded it outgrew the site and bought other premises in and around Shrewsbury, then in 1978 relocated to Hereford after finding accommodation that would enable it to consolidate its facilities into one campus.

After the college's departure the building was empty for several years until work began to convert it into a hotel in 1986, which was opened on 12th April 1989.

== See also ==
- Grade II* listed buildings in Shropshire Council (H–Z)
- Listed buildings in Alberbury with Cardeston
