= Alberbury Castle =

Castle in Alberbury with Cardeston, Shropshire, England

- Alberbury, Shropshire, England
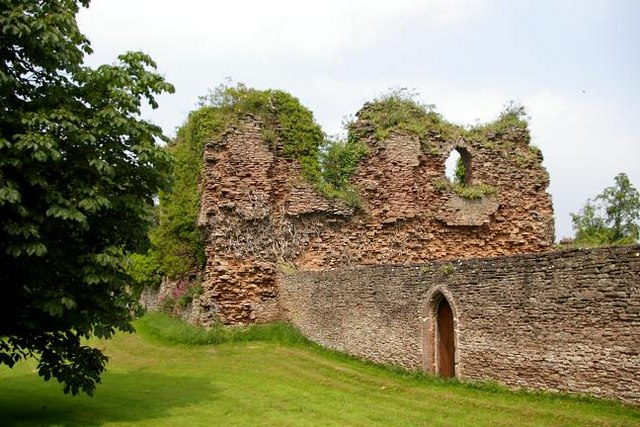
- Alberbury Castle

Site information
- Condition: Ruined

Location
- Shown within Shropshire
- Location within Shropshire
- Coordinates: 52.7234°N 2.9520°W
- Grid reference: grid reference SJ358144

Site history
- Materials: Stone

Alberbury Castle is in the village of Alberbury – some nine miles west of Shrewsbury, Shropshire and very close to the border with Wales. The building has been constructed from locally available red sandstone. It is a Grade II listed building.

Its origins are uncertain but it was probably built in the 13th century by Fulk FitzWarin during the reign of Richard I. According to Sir William Dugdale, the castle of Alberbury was given to Guarine de Metz, the ancestor of FitzWarin family, by William the Conqueror. However, this account is disputed by the Domesday Book of 1086.

The main purpose of its construction appears to have been as a barrier to stop the Welsh onslaught and to retain control of the passes along the River Severn. According to sources, the castle was razed by Llewellyn the Great in 1223, only to be rebuilt three years later in 1226, this time with a stone wall surrounding the bailey. A few years later, the Sheriff of Shropshire, Thomas Corbet of Caus, took advantage of a hasty utterance of Fulk FitzWarin, and had him ejected from the castle and took over his lands citing FitzWarin's words as a renunciation of fealty. However, Fitzwarin was able to retake his lands and his manor through the law. The FitzWarin family retained possession of the castle, although they moved their seat of power to Whittington after they secured it as a stronghold, till the mid fourteenth century, when it may have been abandoned.

A church building adjoining the castle, with a single high tower with a triangular roof, that may have been useful as an outpost or a look out, still exists today as Alberbury's parish church of St Michael. It was founded by the FitzWarin family during the reign of Henry I.

The castle has had a number of owners over the years. In 1842, the ruins of the castle were owned by Sir Baldwin Leighton according to Charles Hulbert. It is not currently possible to visit the castle as it lies on private land.

== See also ==
- Listed buildings in Alberbury with Cardeston
- Castles in Great Britain and Ireland
- List of castles in England
