= Wattlesborough Castle =

Grade I listed castle in Shropshire, United Kingdom

Wattlesborough Tower
- Alberbury, Shropshire, England
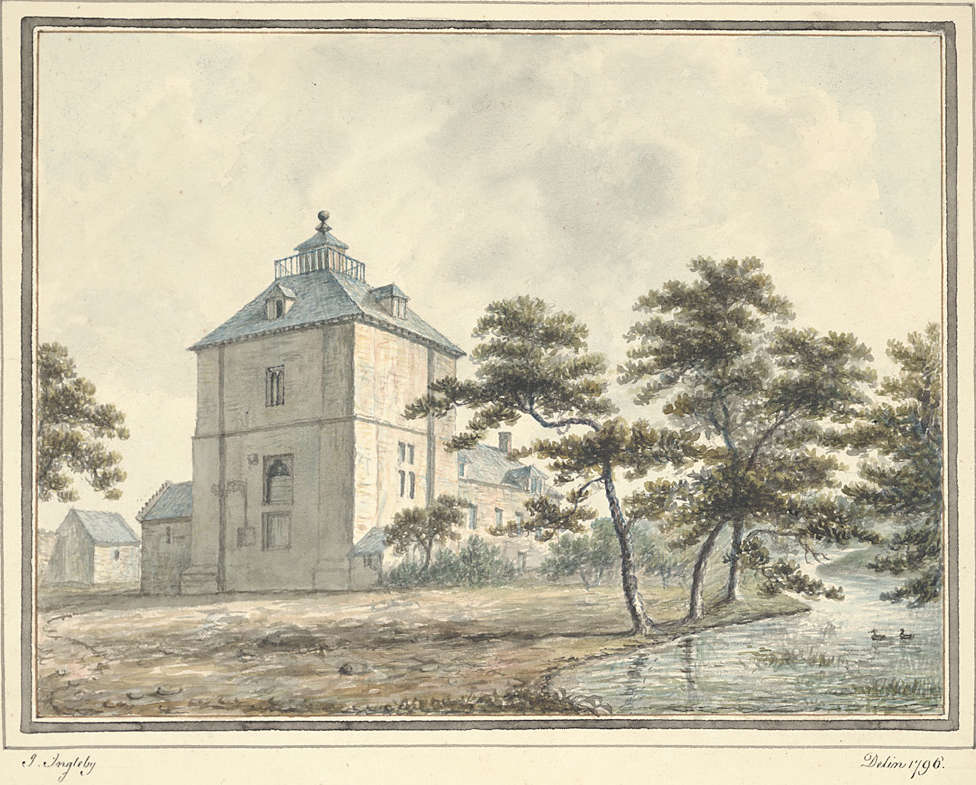
- Wattlesborough Tower, Alberbury

Site information
- Type: Tower House
- Owner: Private
- Condition: Ruined

Location
- Shown within Shropshire
- Location within Shropshire
- Coordinates: 52.7074°N 2.9560°W

Site history
- Materials: Stone

Wattlesborough Tower is a ruined fortified 13th-century manor house or Tower House in Shropshire. It is situated close to the boundary with Powys in Wales. Wattlesborough is a former township within the present parish of Alberbury. The castle is a Grade I listed scheduled monument. The Tower comprises a square two-storey tower above an undercroft surrounded by a moated enclosure with a fishpond. The Leighton family inherited Wattlesborough in 1471 and used it as their chief residence until circa 1711. At that time an adjoining farm building was constructed and named Wattlesborough Hall.

== History ==
The manor of Wattlesborough was held by Edric before the Norman Conquest and by the time of the Domesday Book in 1086 it had passed to Roger Fitz Corbet and subsequently held as one Knight's fee by the successors of Roger as Lords of Caus in Shropshire. Edward Blore gives the succession of Wattlesborough, from the Corbets, to the Mawdy from 1382–1414, to the De Burghs from 1414–1471 and from 1471 when it passed to the Leighton family. Blore thought that the Tower had been built by Roger Corbet in 1280, but this may be a little too early. A John Leighton was MP for Shropshire in 1468, and he was followed by other family members who also served as MP for Shropshire. The Leighton family lived at Wattlesborough until 1711, when they moved to nearby Loton. From then onwards Wattlesborough became a farmhouse.

== Architectural history ==
The castle is a Grade I listed scheduled monument. Only the roofless tower remains and its condition is officially classified as poor. Historic England are in discussions with the owners to decide the best way of preserving the building.

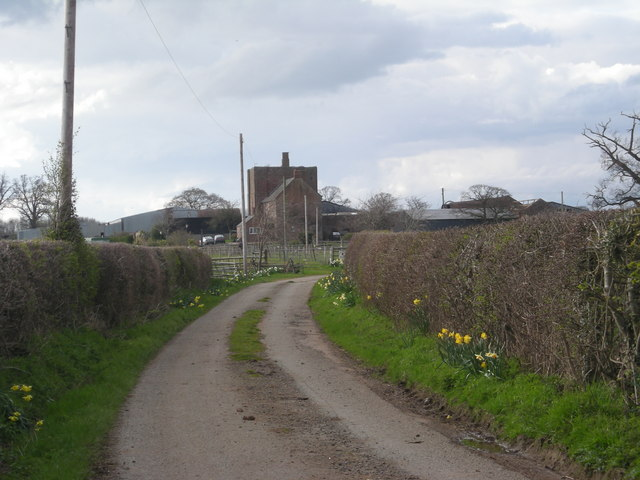
Wattlesborough Castle and Hall

== Literature ==
- Blore E., (1868), Wattlesborough Tower, Shropshire, Archaeological Journal Vol XXV, 96–102.
- Gaydon A.T. (ed.) A History of Shropshire. Vol. VIII, (Condover and Ford Hundreds). Victoria County History of England, OUP, Oxford. pp196– 198.
- Mercer E., English Architecture to 1900: The Shropshire Experience Logaston Press, 2003.
- J Newman and N Pevsner The Buildings of England: Shropshire, Yale 2006. pg. 152

== See also ==
- Grade I listed buildings in Shropshire
- Listed buildings in Alberbury with Cardeston

== Gallery ==
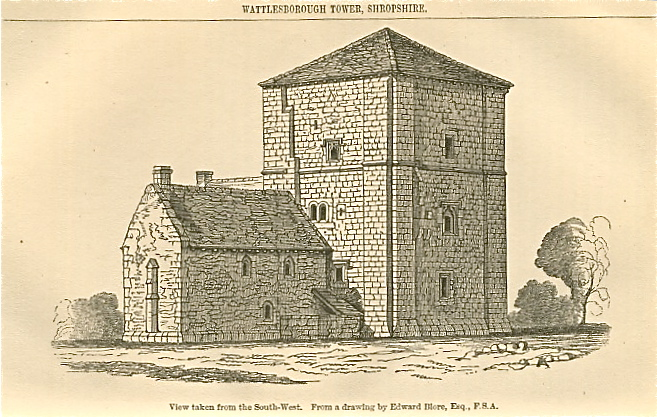
Wattlesborough Tower, Shropshire in 1858

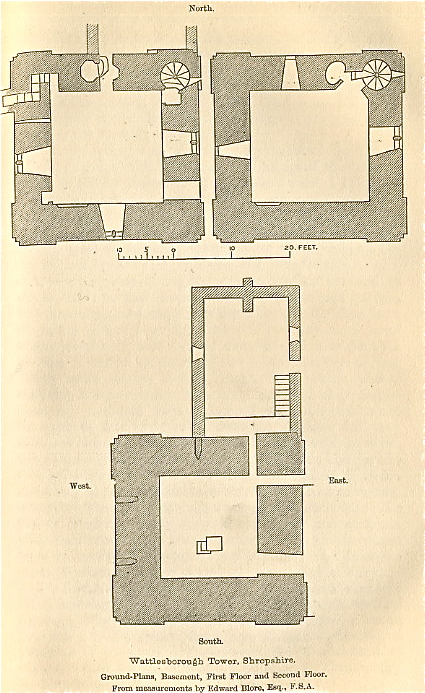
Wattlesborough Tower, Shropshire. Floorplans

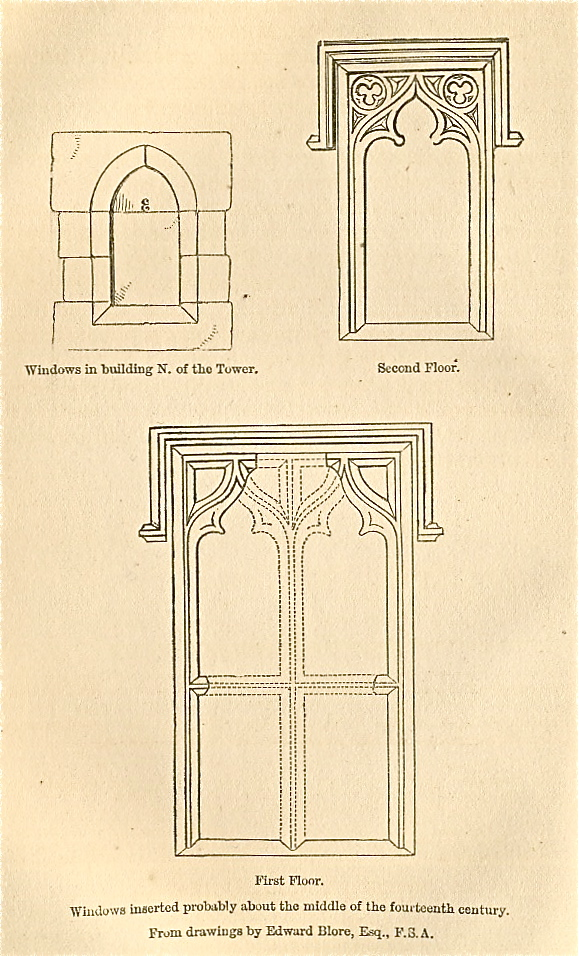
Wattlesborough Tower, Shropshire]. Windows
