= Alberbury =

Village in Shropshire, England

Coordinates: 52.7230°N 2.9502°W

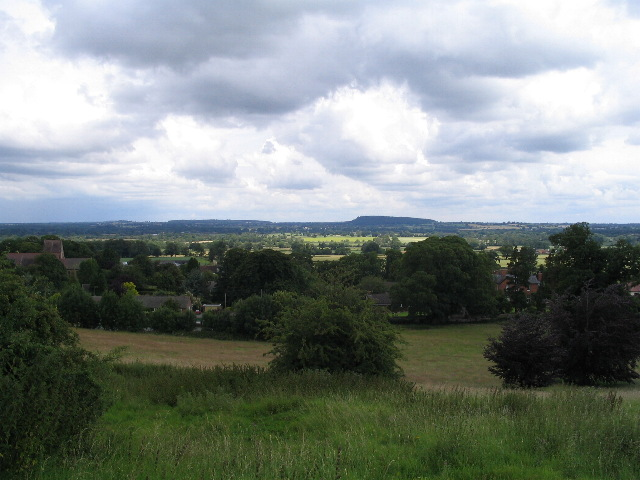
- Alberbury, with Nesscliffe hill in the distance

- Location within Shropshire
- OS grid reference: SJ358143
- Civil parish: Alberbury with Cardeston
- Unitary authority: Shropshire
- Ceremonial county: Shropshire
- Region: West Midlands
- Country: England
- Sovereign state: United Kingdom
- Post town: SHREWSBURY
- Postcode district: SY5
- Dialling code: 01743
- Police: West Mercia
- Fire: Shropshire
- Ambulance: West Midlands
- UK Parliament: Shrewsbury

Alberbury is a village in Shropshire, England, 9 miles (14 km) west of Shrewsbury on the B4393 road which travels from Ford to Lake Vyrnwy. It is on to the England-Wales border, marked by a roadside tree, Prince's Oak.

The River Severn runs just north of the village, and most of the village is in a designated conservation area.

Alberbury Castle is at the centre of the village as is Loton Hall and the attached deer park. Alberbury is home to Loton Park, with the Loton Park Hill Climb run by the Hagley and District Light Car Club. The village also has a cricket club.

As part of the development of Central Ammunition Depot Nesscliffe in World War II, an ammunition depot was built beneath Loton Park. This was used for storage of Incendiary ammunition and chemical weapons shells and was operated in co-operation with and guarded by the United States Army Air Forces.

The village hall hosts meetings of the Women's Institute and the Young Farmers' Club. In 2008, the village made regional news due to a spectacular Christmas lights display put on at a local farm.

== See also ==
- Alberbury Priory
- Listed buildings in Alberbury with Cardeston
