= Autosport Awards =

British awards for achievements in motorsport presented by Autosport

- Awarded for: Outstanding achievements in motorsport
- Country: United Kingdom
- Presented by: Autosport
- First award: 1982; 44 years ago
- Website: www.autosport.com/autosport-awards/

The Autosport Awards are a series of awards presented by British motorsport magazine Autosport to drivers, constructors, executives and promoters for achievements that season in auto racing and rallying.

Select awards are voted for by the general public via a readers' poll, with others chosen by a panel of experts. The awards have been presented every year since 1982. They were traditionally held in December each year at the Grosvenor House Hotel in Mayfair. For the 2024 edition, they moved to the Roundhouse in Camden and hosted the awards the following January.

== History ==
The Autosport Awards were founded by British motorsport magazine Autosport in 1982, when the magazine requested its readers voted on eight categories, including International Racing Driver, International Rally Driver, National Racing Driver, National Rally Driver, and British Competition Driver. The event was first hosted in-person in 1988, and was traditionally held at the Grosvenor House Hotel in Mayfair each December until 2023. For the 2024 edition, the ceremony moved to the Roundhouse in Camden, which hosted the awards in January 2025.

== Categories ==
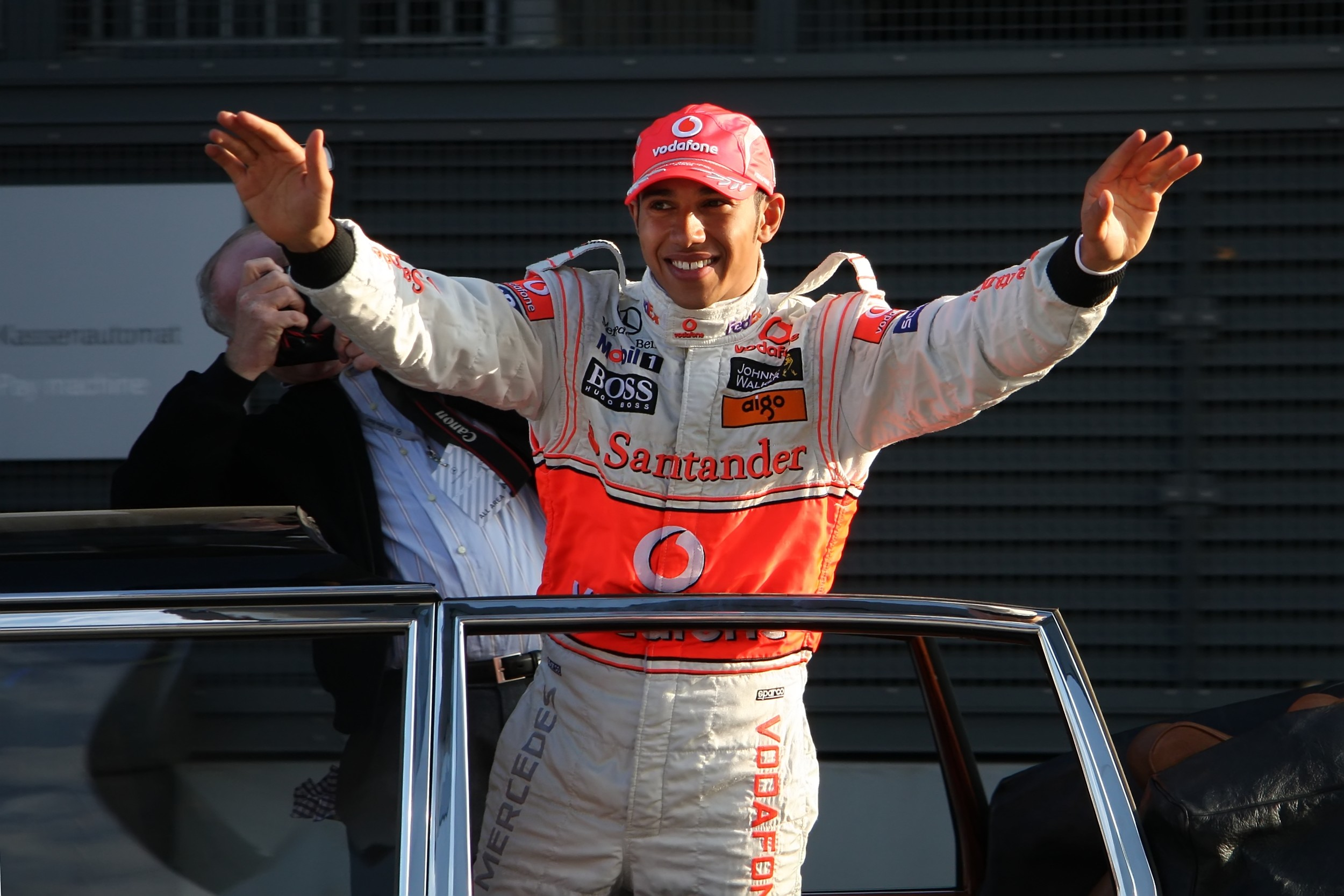
Lewis Hamilton (pictured in 2008) won the International Racing Driver Award a record eight times between 2007 and 2020.

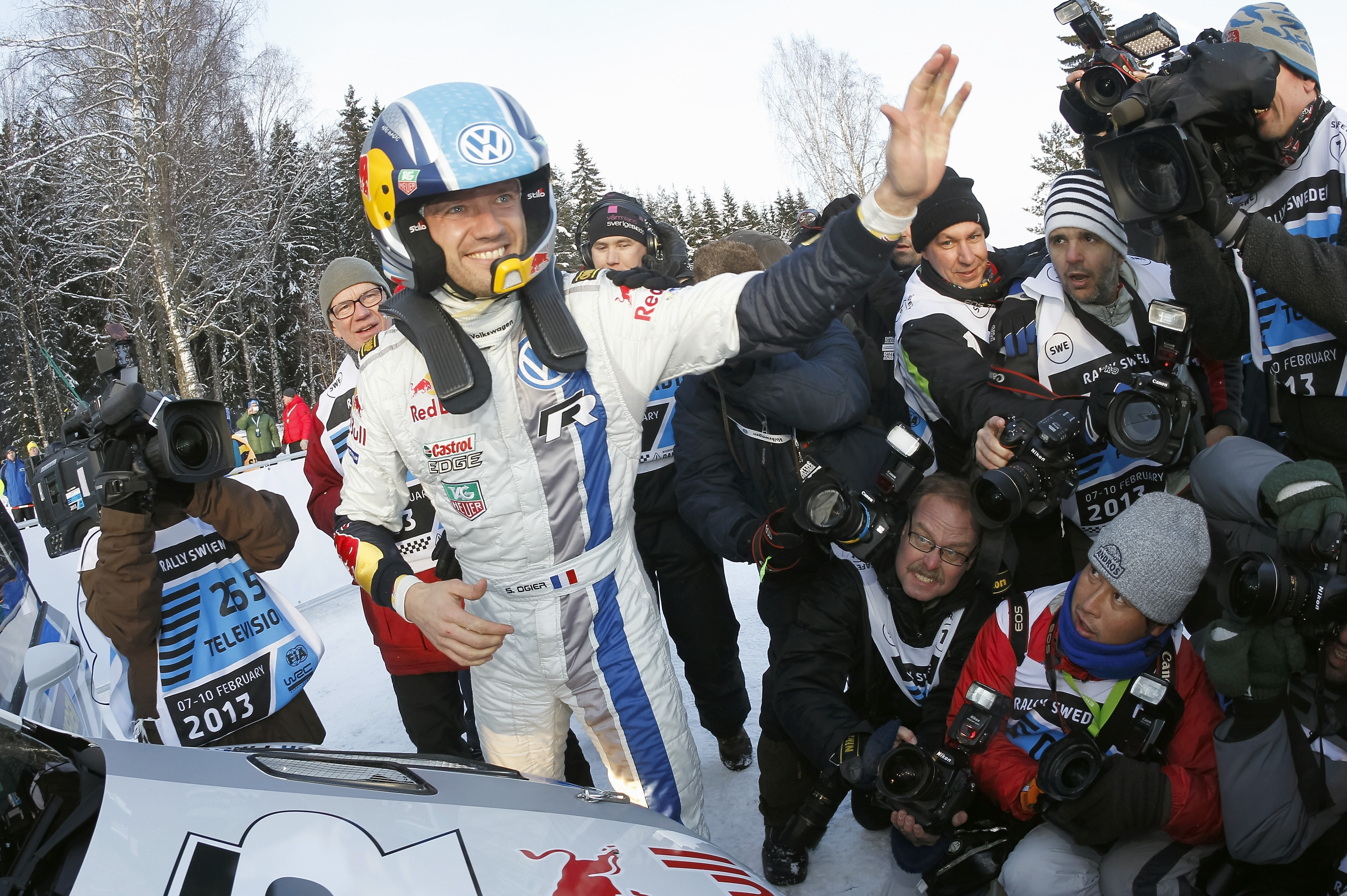
Sébastien Ogier (pictured in 2013) won the International Rally Driver Award a record eight times between 2013 and 2024.

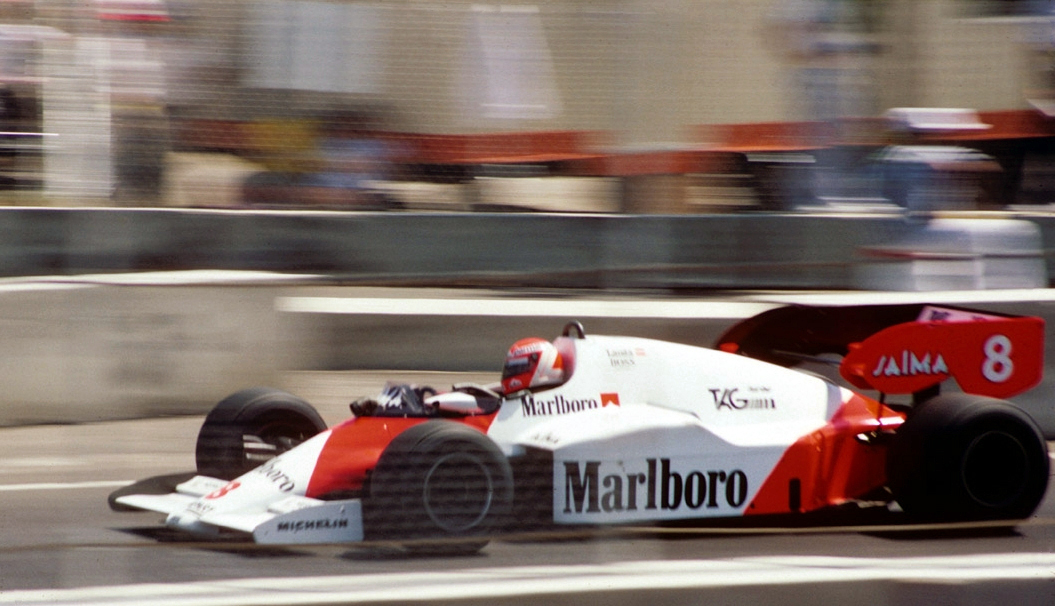
McLaren have won Car of the Year awards a record eight times between 1984 and 2024.

There were 12 categories awarded by the magazine in 2024—four of which selected by popular vote and the balance chosen by a panel of experts, including Autosport journalists:

- Silverstone Autosport BRDC Award (1989–present)
- International Racing Driver Award (1982–present)
- International Rally Driver Award (1982–present)
- National Driver of the Year (1982–present)
  - Formerly divided into National Racing Driver of the Year and National Rally Driver of the Year from 1982 to 2007.
- International Competition Car of the Year (1982–present)
  - Formerly divided into Racing Car of the Year and Rally Car of the Year from 1982 to 2022.
- British Competition Driver of the Year (1982–present)
- Rookie of the Year (2000–present)
- Pioneering and Innovation Award (2004–present)
- Moment of the Year (2008, 2010, 2019–2020, 2022–present)
- Brand Partnership of the Year (2023–present)
- Promoter of the Year (2023–present)
- Person of the Year (2024–present)
- F1 Academy Rising Star (2024–present)

=== Former categories ===
- British Club Driver of the Year (1982–2017)
- John Bolster Award for Technical Achievement (1985–2019, 2023)
- Gregor Grant Award (1989–2019, 2022)
- Sportsman Award (1989–1991)
- Rider of the Year (2016–2020)
- Williams Engineer of the Future (2017–2018, 2022–2023)
- Esports Driver of the Year (2020–2022)
- Esports Team of the Year (2021–2022)
- Gold Medal Award (2021–2023)

== Winners ==
=== International Racing Driver Award ===
Year	Winner	Series	Ref
1982	(Finland) Keke Rosberg	Formula One	
1983	(Brazil) Nelson Piquet	Formula One	
1984	(Austria) Niki Lauda	Formula One	
1985	(France) Alain Prost	Formula One	
1986	(United Kingdom) Nigel Mansell	Formula One	
1987	(United Kingdom) Nigel Mansell (2)	Formula One	
1988	(Brazil) Ayrton Senna	Formula One	
1989	(France) Jean Alesi	International Formula 3000	
1989	(France) Jean Alesi	Formula One	
1990	(Brazil) Ayrton Senna (2)	Formula One	
1991	(Brazil) Ayrton Senna (3)	Formula One	
1992	(United Kingdom) Nigel Mansell (3)	Formula One	
1993	(United Kingdom) Nigel Mansell (4)	CART PPG Indy Car	
1994	(United Kingdom) Damon Hill	Formula One	
1995	(Germany) Michael Schumacher	Formula One	
1996	(United Kingdom) Damon Hill (2)	Formula One	
1997	(Canada) Jacques Villeneuve	Formula One	
1998	(Finland) Mika Häkkinen	Formula One	
1999	(Finland) Mika Häkkinen (2)	Formula One	
2000	(Germany) Michael Schumacher (2)	Formula One	
2001	(Germany) Michael Schumacher (3)	Formula One	
2002	(Germany) Michael Schumacher (4)	Formula One	
2003	(Colombia) Juan Pablo Montoya	Formula One	
2004	(United Kingdom) Jenson Button	Formula One	
2005	(Finland) Kimi Räikkönen	Formula One	
2006	(Spain) Fernando Alonso	Formula One	
2007	(United Kingdom) Lewis Hamilton	Formula One	
2008	(United Kingdom) Lewis Hamilton (2)	Formula One	
2009	(United Kingdom) Jenson Button (2)	Formula One	
2010	(Germany) Sebastian Vettel	Formula One	
2011	(Germany) Sebastian Vettel (2)	Formula One	
2012	(Germany) Sebastian Vettel (3)	Formula One	
2013	(Germany) Sebastian Vettel (4)	Formula One	
2014	(United Kingdom) Lewis Hamilton (3)	Formula One	
2015	(United Kingdom) Lewis Hamilton (4)	Formula One	
2016	(Germany) Nico Rosberg	Formula One	
2017	(United Kingdom) Lewis Hamilton (5)	Formula One	
2018	(United Kingdom) Lewis Hamilton (6)	Formula One	
2019	(United Kingdom) Lewis Hamilton (7)	Formula One	
2020	(United Kingdom) Lewis Hamilton (8)	Formula One	
2021	(Netherlands) Max Verstappen	Formula One	
2022	(Netherlands) Max Verstappen (2)	Formula One	
2023	(Netherlands) Max Verstappen (3)	Formula One	
2024	(Netherlands) Max Verstappen (4)	Formula One	
2025	(Netherlands) Max Verstappen (5)	Formula One	

=== International Rally Driver Award ===
Year	Winner	Series	Ref
1982	(France) Michèle Mouton	World Rally Championship	
1983	(Sweden) Stig Blomqvist	World Rally Championship	
1984	(Finland) Ari Vatanen	World Rally Championship	
1985	(Finland) Timo Salonen	World Rally Championship	
1986	(Finland) Juha Kankkunen	World Rally Championship	
1987	(Finland) Juha Kankkunen (2)	World Rally Championship	
1988	(Finland) Markku Alén	World Rally Championship	
1989	(Italy) Miki Biasion	World Rally Championship	
1990	(Spain) Carlos Sainz	World Rally Championship	
1991	(Spain) Carlos Sainz (2)	World Rally Championship	
1992	(France) Didier Auriol	World Rally Championship	
1993	(Finland) Juha Kankkunen (3)	World Rally Championship	
1994	(United Kingdom) Colin McRae	World Rally Championship	
1995	(United Kingdom) Colin McRae (2)	World Rally Championship	
1996	(Finland) Tommi Mäkinen	World Rally Championship	
1997	(Finland) Tommi Mäkinen (2)	World Rally Championship	
1997	(United Kingdom) Colin McRae (3)	World Rally Championship	
1998	(Finland) Tommi Mäkinen (3)	World Rally Championship	
1999	(Finland) Tommi Mäkinen (4)	World Rally Championship	
2000	(United Kingdom) Richard Burns	World Rally Championship	
2001	(United Kingdom) Richard Burns (2)	World Rally Championship	
2002	(Finland) Marcus Grönholm	World Rally Championship	
2003	(Norway) Petter Solberg	World Rally Championship	
2004	(France) Sébastien Loeb	World Rally Championship	
2005	(France) Sébastien Loeb (2)	World Rally Championship	
2006	(France) Sébastien Loeb (3)	World Rally Championship	
2007	(Finland) Marcus Grönholm (2)	World Rally Championship	
2008	(France) Sébastien Loeb (4)	World Rally Championship	
2009	(Finland) Mikko Hirvonen	World Rally Championship	
2010	(France) Sébastien Loeb (5)	World Rally Championship	
2011	(France) Sébastien Loeb (6)	World Rally Championship	
2012	(France) Sébastien Loeb (7)	World Rally Championship	
2013	(France) Sébastien Ogier	World Rally Championship	
2014	(France) Sébastien Ogier (2)	World Rally Championship	
2015	(France) Sébastien Ogier (3)	World Rally Championship	
2016	(France) Sébastien Ogier (4)	World Rally Championship	
2017	(France) Sébastien Ogier (5)	World Rally Championship	
2018	(France) Sébastien Ogier (6)	World Rally Championship	
2019	(Estonia) Ott Tänak	World Rally Championship	
2020	(United Kingdom) Elfyn Evans	World Rally Championship	
2021	(France) Sébastien Ogier (7)	World Rally Championship	
2022	(Finland) Kalle Rovanperä	World Rally Championship	
2023	(Finland) Kalle Rovanperä (2)	World Rally Championship	
2024	(France) Sébastien Ogier (8)	World Rally Championship	
2025	(France) Sébastien Ogier (9)	World Rally Championship	

=== National Driver of the Year ===
==== National Racing Driver of the Year ====
Year	Winner	Series	Ref
1982	(Republic of Ireland) Tommy Byrne	British Formula Three	
1983	(United Kingdom) Martin Brundle	British Formula Three	
1984	(United Kingdom) Johnny Dumfries	British Formula Three	
1985	(United Kingdom) Andy Rouse	BSCC	
1986	(United Kingdom) Andy Wallace	British Formula Three	
1987	(United Kingdom) Johnny Herbert	British Formula Three	
1988	(Finland) JJ Lehto	British Formula Three	
1989	(United Kingdom) Allan McNish	British Formula Three	
1990	(United Kingdom) Robb Gravett	BTCC	
1991	(United Kingdom) David Coulthard	British Formula Three	
1992	(United Kingdom) Tim Harvey	BTCC	
1993	(United Kingdom) Kelvin Burt	BTCC	
1994	(Italy) Gabriele Tarquini	BTCC	
1995	(United Kingdom) John Cleland	BTCC	
1996	(Germany) Frank Biela	BTCC	
1997	(Switzerland) Alain Menu	BTCC	
1998	(Sweden) Rickard Rydell	BTCC	
1999	(France) Laurent Aïello	BTCC	
2000	(Brazil) Antônio Pizzonia	British Formula Three	
2001	(Japan) Takuma Sato	British Formula Three	
2002	(United Kingdom) Robbie Kerr	British Formula Three	
2003	(Brazil) Nelson Piquet Jr.	British Formula Three	
2004	(United Kingdom) James Thompson	BTCC	
2005	(United Kingdom) Matt Neal	BTCC	
2006	(United Kingdom) Mike Conway	British Formula Three	
2007	(United Kingdom) Jason Plato	BTCC	

==== National Rally Driver of the Year ====
Year	Winner	Series	Ref
1982	(United Kingdom) Malcolm Patrick	British Open Rally Championship	
1983	(United Kingdom) Darryl Weidner	British Open Rally Championship	
1984	(United Kingdom) David Llewellin	British Open Rally Championship	
1985	(United Kingdom) Mark Lovell	British Open Rally Championship	
1986	(United Kingdom) Ken Wood	Scottish Rally Championship	
1987	(United Kingdom) Louise Aitken-Walker	British Open Rally Championship	
1988	(United Kingdom) Malcolm Wilson	British Open Rally Championship	
1989	(United Kingdom) David Llewellin (2)	British Open Rally Championship	
1990	(United Kingdom) David Llewellin (3)	British Rally Championship	
1991	(United Kingdom) Colin McRae	British Rally Championship	
1992	(United Kingdom) Colin McRae (2)	British Rally Championship	
1993	(United Kingdom) Richard Burns	British Rally Championship	
1994	(United Kingdom) Malcolm Wilson (2)	British Rally Championship	
1995	(United Kingdom) Alister McRae	British Rally Championship	
1996	(United Kingdom) Gwyndaf Evans	British Rally Championship	
1997	(United Kingdom) Mark Higgins	British Rally Championship	
1998	(United Kingdom) Martin Rowe	British Rally Championship	
1999	(Finland) Tapio Laukkanen	British Rally Championship	
2000	(United Kingdom) Mark Higgins (2)	British Rally Championship	
2001	(United Kingdom) Justin Dale	British Rally Championship	
2002	(United Kingdom) Justin Dale	British Rally Championship	
2003	(United Kingdom) Martin Rowe	Production World Rally Championship	
2004	(United Kingdom) Guy Wilks	British Rally Championship	
2005	(United Kingdom) Mark Higgins (3)	British Rally Championship	
2006	(United Kingdom) Mark Higgins (4)	British Rally Championship	
2007	(United Kingdom) Mark Higgins (5)	British Rally Championship	

In 2008, the National Racing Driver of the Year and National Rally Driver of the Year categories merged to form the National Driver of the Year award. The winner receives the Paul Warwick Memorial Trophy.

Year	Winner	Series	Ref
2008	(United Kingdom) Oliver Turvey	British Formula Three	
2009	(United Kingdom) Colin Turkington	BTCC	
2010	(United Kingdom) Jason Plato (2)	BTCC	
2011	(United Kingdom) Matt Neal (2)	BTCC	
2012	(United Kingdom) Gordon Shedden	BTCC	
2013	(United Kingdom) Andrew Jordan	BTCC	
2014	(United Kingdom) Colin Turkington (2)	BTCC	
2015	(United Kingdom) Gordon Shedden (2)	BTCC	
2016	(United Kingdom) Gordon Shedden (3)	BTCC	
2017	(United Kingdom) Lando Norris	FIA Formula 3 European	
2018	(United Kingdom) Dan Ticktum	FIA Formula 3 European	
2019	(United Kingdom) Colin Turkington (3)	BTCC	
2020	(United Kingdom) Harry King	Porsche Carrera Cup GB	
2021	(United Kingdom) Ashley Sutton	BTCC	
2022	(United Kingdom) Tom Ingram	BTCC	
2023	(United Kingdom) Freddie Slater	Ginetta Junior	
2024	(United Kingdom) Jake Hill	BTCC	

=== International Competition Car of the Year ===
==== Racing Car of the Year ====
Year	Winner		Type	Ref
Year	Constructor	Car	Type	Ref
1982	(Germany) Porsche	956	Group C	
1983	(United Kingdom) Brabham	BT52	Formula One	
1984	(United Kingdom) McLaren	MP4/2	Formula One	
1985	(United Kingdom) Williams	FW10B	Formula One	
1986	(United Kingdom) Williams (2)	FW11	Formula One	
1987	(United Kingdom) Jaguar	XJR-8	Group C	
1988	(United Kingdom) McLaren (2)	MP4/4	Formula One	
1989	(Switzerland) Sauber	C9	Group C	
1990	(United Kingdom) Tyrrell	019	Formula One	
1991	(Republic of Ireland) Jordan	191	Formula One	
1992	(United Kingdom) Williams (3)	FW14B	Formula One	
1993	(United Kingdom) Williams (4)	FW15C	Formula One	
1994	(United Kingdom) Benetton	B194	Formula One	
1995	(United Kingdom) Williams (5)	FW17	Formula One	
1996	(United Kingdom) Williams (6)	FW18	Formula One	
1997	(United Kingdom) Williams (7)	FW19	Formula One	
1998	(United Kingdom) McLaren (3)	MP4/13	Formula One	
1999	(United Kingdom) McLaren (4)	MP4/14	Formula One	
2000	(Italy) Ferrari	F1-2000	Formula One	
2001	(Italy) Ferrari (2)	F2001	Formula One	
2002	(Italy) Ferrari (3)	F2002	Formula One	
2003	(United Kingdom) Bentley	Speed 8	Le Mans Prototype	
2004	(Italy) Ferrari (4)	F2004	Formula One	
2005	(United Kingdom) McLaren (5)	MP4-20	Formula One	
2006	(France) Renault	R26	Formula One	
2007	(United Kingdom) McLaren (6)	MP4-22	Formula One	
2008	(United Kingdom) McLaren (7)	MP4-23	Formula One	
2009	(United Kingdom) Brawn GP	BGP 001	Formula One	
2010	(Austria) Red Bull Racing	RB6	Formula One	
2011	(Austria) Red Bull Racing (2)	RB7	Formula One	
2012	(Austria) Red Bull Racing (3)	RB8	Formula One	
2013	(Austria) Red Bull Racing (4)	RB9	Formula One	
2014	(Germany) Mercedes	W05	Formula One	
2015	(Germany) Mercedes (2)	W06	Formula One	
2016	(Germany) Mercedes (3)	W07	Formula One	
2017	(Germany) Mercedes (4)	W08	Formula One	
2018	(Germany) Mercedes (5)	W09	Formula One	
2019	(Germany) Mercedes (6)	W10	Formula One	
2020	(Germany) Mercedes (7)	W11	Formula One	
2021	(Austria) Red Bull Racing (5)	RB16B	Formula One	
2022	(Austria) Red Bull Racing (6)	RB18	Formula One	

==== Rally Car of the Year ====
Year	Winner		Type	Ref
Year	Constructor	Car	Type	Ref
1982	(West Germany) Audi	Quattro A1	Group B	
1983	(West Germany) Audi (2)	Quattro A2	Group B	
1984	(France) Peugeot	205 T16	Group B	
1985	(United Kingdom) MG	Metro 6R4	Group B	
1986	(France) Peugeot (2)	205 T16	Group B	
1987	(Italy) Lancia	Delta HF Integrale	Group A	
1988	(Italy) Lancia (2)	Delta HF Integrale	Group A	
1989	(Italy) Lancia (3)	Delta HF Integrale	Group A	
1990	(Japan) Toyota	Celica GT-Four	Group A	
1991	(Italy) Lancia (4)	Delta HF Integrale	Group A	
1992	(Japan) Subaru	Legacy RS	Group A	
1993	(United States) Ford	Escort RS Cosworth	Group A	
1994	(Japan) Subaru (2)	Impreza 555	Group A	
1995	(Japan) Subaru (3)	Impreza 555	Group A	
1996	(Japan) Subaru (4)	Impreza 555	Group A	
1997	(Japan) Subaru (5)	Impreza WRC97	World Rally Car	
1998	(Japan) Mitsubishi	Lancer Evo V	Group A	
1999	(Japan) Toyota (2)	Corolla WRC	World Rally Car	
2000	(United States) Ford (2)	Focus RS WRC	World Rally Car	
2001	(United States) Ford (3)	Focus RS WRC	World Rally Car	
2002	(France) Peugeot (3)	206 WRC	World Rally Car	
2003	(France) Citroën	Xsara WRC	World Rally Car	
2004	(France) Citroën (2)	Xsara WRC	World Rally Car	
2005	(France) Citroën (3)	Xsara WRC	World Rally Car	
2006	(United States) Ford (4)	Focus RS WRC	World Rally Car	
2007	(United States) Ford (5)	Focus RS WRC	World Rally Car	
2008	(France) Citroën (4)	C4 WRC	World Rally Car	
2009	(France) Citroën (5)	C4 WRC	World Rally Car	
2010	(France) Citroën (6)	C4 WRC	World Rally Car	
2011	(United Kingdom) Mini	John Cooper Works WRC	World Rally Car	
2012	(France) Citroën (7)	DS3 WRC	World Rally Car	
2013	(France) Peugeot (4)	208 T16 Pikes Peak	Pikes Peak	
2014	(Germany) Volkswagen	Polo R WRC	World Rally Car	
2015	(Germany) Volkswagen (2)	Polo R WRC	World Rally Car	
2016	(Germany) Volkswagen (3)	Polo R WRC	World Rally Car	
2017	(United States) Ford (6)	Fiesta WRC	World Rally Car	
2018	(United States) Ford (7)	Fiesta WRC	World Rally Car	
2019	(Japan) Toyota (3)	Yaris WRC	World Rally Car	
2020	(Japan) Toyota (4)	Yaris WRC	World Rally Car	
2021	(Japan) Toyota (5)	Yaris WRC	World Rally Car	
2022	(Japan) Toyota (6)	GR Yaris Rally1	Group Rally1	

In 2023, the Racing Car of the Year and Rally Car of the Year categories merged to form the International Competition Car of the Year award.

Year	Winner		Type	Ref
Year	Constructor	Car	Type	Ref
2023	(Austria) Red Bull Racing (7)	RB19	Formula One	
2024	(United Kingdom) McLaren (8)	MCL38	Formula One	
2025	(United Kingdom) McLaren (9)	MCL39	Formula One	

=== British Competition Driver of the Year ===
Year	Winner	Series	Ref
1982	John Watson	Formula One	
1983	Jonathan Palmer	European Formula Two	
1984	Derek Bell	World Sportscar Championship	
1985	Nigel Mansell	Formula One	
1986	Nigel Mansell (2)	Formula One	
1987	Jonathan Palmer (2)	Formula One	
1988	Martin Brundle	World Sportscar Championship	
1989	Nigel Mansell (3)	Formula One	
1990	Martin Brundle (2)	World Sportscar Championship	
1991	Nigel Mansell (4)	Formula One	
1992	Derek Warwick	World Sportscar Championship	
1993	Damon Hill	Formula One	
1994	David Coulthard	International Formula 3000	
1994	David Coulthard	Formula One	
1995	Damon Hill (2)	Formula One	
1996	Damon Hill (3)	Formula One	
1997	Mark Blundell	CART	
1998	Dario Franchitti	CART	
1999	Eddie Irvine	Formula One	
2000	David Coulthard (2)	Formula One	
2001	David Coulthard (3)	Formula One	
2002	David Coulthard (4)	Formula One	
2003	Jenson Button	Formula One	
2004	Andy Priaulx	ETCC	
2005	Dan Wheldon	IndyCar Series	
2006	Jenson Button (2)	Formula One	
2007	Lewis Hamilton	Formula One	
2008	Allan McNish	Le Mans Series	
2009	Jenson Button (3)	Formula One	
2010	Dario Franchitti (2)	IndyCar Series	
2011	Jenson Button (4)	Formula One	
2012	Jenson Button (5)	Formula One	
2013	Lewis Hamilton (2)	Formula One	
2014	Lewis Hamilton (3)	Formula One	
2015	Lewis Hamilton (4)	Formula One	
2016	Lewis Hamilton (5)	Formula One	
2017	Lewis Hamilton (6)	Formula One	
2018	Lewis Hamilton (7)	Formula One	
2019	Lando Norris	Formula One	
2020	Lando Norris (2)	Formula One	
2021	Lando Norris (3)	Formula One	
2022	Lewis Hamilton (8)	Formula One	
2023	Lando Norris (4)	Formula One	
2024	Lando Norris (5)	Formula One	
2025	Lando Norris (6)	Formula One	

==== Rookie of the Year ====
Year	Winner	Series	Ref
2000	(United Kingdom) Jenson Button	Formula One	
2001	(Colombia) Juan Pablo Montoya	Formula One	
2002	(Australia) Mark Webber	Formula One	
2003	(United Kingdom) Dan Wheldon	IndyCar Series	
2004	(United States) A. J. Allmendinger	Champ Car	
2005	(Portugal) Tiago Monteiro	Formula One	
2006	(United Kingdom) Lewis Hamilton	GP2 Series	
2007	(United Kingdom) Lewis Hamilton (2)	Formula One	
2008	(Germany) Sebastian Vettel	Formula One	
2009	(United Kingdom) Kris Meeke	Intercontinental Rally Challenge	
2010	(Japan) Kamui Kobayashi	Formula One	
2011	(United Kingdom) Paul di Resta	Formula One	
2012	(Switzerland) Mathéo Tuscher	FIA Formula Two	
2013	(France) Jules Bianchi	Formula One	
2014	(Russia) Daniil Kvyat	Formula One	
2015	(Netherlands) Max Verstappen	Formula One	
2016	(Germany) Pascal Wehrlein	Formula One	
2017	(Monaco) Charles Leclerc	FIA Formula 2	
2018	(Monaco) Charles Leclerc (2)	Formula One	
2019	(Thailand) Alexander Albon	Formula One	
2020	(Australia) Oscar Piastri	FIA Formula 3	
2021	(Australia) Oscar Piastri (2)	FIA Formula 2	
2022	(China) Zhou Guanyu	Formula One	
2023	(Australia) Oscar Piastri (3)	Formula One	
2025	(France) Isack Hadjar	Formula One	

=== Pioneering and Innovation Award ===
Year	Winner
2004	SAFER barrier
2005	GP2 Series
2006	Audi R10 TDI
2007	HANS device
2008	Singapore Grand Prix
2009	F1 in Schools
2010	McLaren (F-duct)
2011	Senna
2012	FIA medical team
2012	DeltaWing
2013	Nissan GT Academy
2014	FIA Formula E Championship
2015	McLaren Applied Technologies
2016	Frédéric Sausset
not awarded in 2017
2018	FIA (halo)
2019	W Series
2020	24 Hours of Le Mans Virtual
2021	Alejandro Agag
not awarded in 2022 and 2023
2024	Pirelli

=== Moment of the Year ===
Year	Winner	For	Ref
2008	(United Kingdom) James Allen (United Kingdom) Martin Brundle	TV commentary of the Brazilian Grand Prix on ITV	
2009	Not awarded		
2010	(Finland) Heikki Kovalainen	Lotus T127 catching fire at the Singapore Grand Prix	
2011 – 2018	Not awarded		
2019	(France) Jean-Éric Vergne	Becoming the first driver to win multiple Formula E titles	
2020	(France) Pierre Gasly	Maiden Formula One victory for AlphaTauri at the Italian Grand Prix	
2021	Not awarded		
2022	(United Kingdom) George Russell	Maiden Formula One victory at the São Paulo Grand Prix	
2023	Not awarded		
2024	(Netherlands) Max Verstappen	Victory from seventeenth at the rain-affected São Paulo Grand Prix	

=== Brand Partnership of the Year ===
Year	Winner
2023	Gulf Oil - Gulf Williams F1 Fan Livery campaign
2024	Peroni Nastro Azzurro 0.0% and Scuderia Ferrari

=== Promoter of the Year ===
Year	Winner
2023	Silverstone Circuit
2024	Las Vegas Strip Circuit
2025	Miami Grand Prix

=== Person of the Year ===
Year	Winner
2024	Andrea Stella

=== F1 Academy Rising Star ===
Year	Winner
2024	Luna Fluxá

=== Autosport Champion ===
Year	Winner
2025	Lando Norris

=== Former awards ===
==== British Club Driver of the Year ====
Year	Winner	Series	Ref
1982	Martin Bolsover	British Hill Climb	
1983	Martin Bolsover (2)	British Hill Climb	
1984	Rod Birley	Modified Saloon Car	
1985	Chris Cramer	British Hill Climb	
1986	Paul Warwick	Formula Ford 1600	
1987	Eddie Irvine	British Formula Ford	
1988	Allan McNish	Formula Vauxhall	
1989	David Coulthard	Formula Ford 1600	
1990	Warren Hughes	British Formula Ford	
1991	Kelvin Burt	Formula Vauxhall	
1992	Oliver Gavin	Formula Vauxhall	
1993	Dario Franchitti	Formula Vauxhall	
1994	James Matthews	British Formula Renault	
1995	Guy Smith	British Formula Renault	
1996	Peter Dumbreck	Formula Vauxhall	
1997	Doug Bell	Formula Vauxhall Junior	
1998	Richard Lyons	Formula Vauxhall Junior	
1999	Andy Priaulx	Renault Spider	
2000	Michael Caine	TVR Tuscan Challenge	
2001	Mike Jordan	British GT	
2002	Danny Watts	British Formula Renault	
2003	Lewis Hamilton	British Formula Renault	
2004	James Pickford	SEAT León Cupra Cup	
2005	Andrew Kirkaldy	British GT	
2006	Sam Bird	British Formula Renault	
2007	Duncan Tappy	British Formula Renault	
2008	Adam Christodoulou	British Formula Renault	
2009	Sarah Moore	Ginetta Junior	
2010	Tom Blomqvist	British Formula Renault	
2011	Alex Lynn	British Formula Renault	
2012	Scott Malvern	British Formula Renault	
2013	Dan Cammish	British Formula Ford	
2014	Ben Barnicoat	Formula Renault NEC	
2015	Will Palmer	BRDC F4	
2016	Lando Norris	Formula Renault Eurocup	
2017	Enaam Ahmed	BRDC British F3	

==== John Bolster Award for Technical Achievement ====
Named in honour of the technical editor of Autosport from 1950 to 1984.

Year	Winner	Note
1985	David Gould	Gould-Hart 84/2
1986	Paul Squires & Phil Kidsley	Brabham BT28-PKS003 Lysholm
1987	Karl Schollar	Spectre-KTM
1988	George Bewley	Bewley-Jawa
1989	Ray Rowan	Roman-Hart IVH
1990	Harvey Postlethwaite	Tyrrell 019
1991	Ross Brawn	Jaguar XJR-14
1992	Patrick Head	Williams FW14B
1993	McLaren International	McLaren MP4/8
1994	Mercedes-Benz	Mercedes-Benz 500I engine
1995	McLaren International	McLaren F1 GTR
1996	Renault Sport	Renault V10 Formula One engine(s)
1997	ThrustSSC	World land speed record
1998	Ken Tyrrell	
1999	Don Panoz	
1999	Jackie Stewart	
2000	Audi	Audi R8
2001	Roger Penske	Penske
2002	Ross Brawn	For achievements in Scuderia Ferrari
2003	Ralph Firman Sr.	Van Diemen
2004	Honda	For achievements in Formula One and Indy
2005	Pat Symonds	
2005	John Force	For achievements in drag racing
2006	Michelin	For achievements in motor racing
2007	Patrick Head	For achievements in his career
2008	Carl Haas for Newman/Haas/Lanigan Racing	For technical achievement
2009	Adrian Newey	For technical achievement
2010	Bridgestone	For achievements in Formula One
2010	Chip Ganassi	For achievements in IndyCar and NASCAR
2011	Giampaolo Dallara for Dallara	For technical achievement
2012	Peter Sauber	For technical achievement
2012	Bob Dance	For achievements in his career
2013	McLaren	For achievements in motor racing
2014	Gordon Murray	For technical achievement
2015	Eddie Jordan	For achievements in motor racing
2015	Porsche	For success in the WEC
2016	Paddy Lowe	For achievements in motor racing
2017	Pierre Fillon for Automobile Club de l'Ouest	24 Hours of Le Mans
2018	Toto Wolff	For achievements with Mercedes-AMG
2019	Charlie Whiting	Posthumous award; for his contributions to motor racing
2023	Christian Horner	For achievements with Red Bull Racing

==== Gregor Grant Award ====
Awarded in recognition of a lifetime of achievement in motorsport.

Year	Winner
1989	John Webb
1990	Mario Andretti
1991	Eric Broadley
1991	Mazda
1992	Bobby Rahal
1993	Murray Walker
1993	Colin McRae
1994	Alain Prost
1995	Leo Mehl
1995	Emerson Fittipaldi
1996	Dale Earnhardt
1996	Gérard "Jabby" Crombac
1997	Johnny Mowlem
1998	Lord March
1998	Klaus Ludwig
1998	Alex Zanardi
1999	Sid Watkins
2000	Hannu Mikkola
2001	Frank Williams
2001	Juan Pablo Montoya
2002	Juan Pablo Montoya
2002	Tom Wheatcroft
2003	Alex Zanardi
2003	Fernando Alonso
2003	Scuderia Ferrari
2004	Carlos Sainz
2005	Bernie Ecclestone
2005	Tom Kristensen
2006	Andy Priaulx
2006	Jack Brabham
2006	James Winslow
2007	Dario Franchitti
2007	Fabrizio Giovanardi
2008	Stirling Moss
2008	Ari Vatanen
2009	Enzo Ferrari
2009	Ron Dennis
2010	Rubens Barrichello
2010	Jackie Stewart
2011	Damon Hill
2011	Dan Wheldon
2012	Sébastien Loeb
2012	Jimmy McRae
2013	Niki Lauda
2013	John Surtees
2014	Richard Petty
2014	Petter Solberg
2015	Nico Hülkenberg
2015	Alan Jones
2016	Nigel Mansell
2017	Nelson Piquet
2017	Derek Warwick
2018	Mika Häkkinen
2018	Jacky Ickx
2018	Stéphane Ratel
2019	Dick Bennetts
2019	Monaco Grand Prix
2022	Sebastian Vettel

==== Sportsman Award ====
Year	Winner	Ref
1989	(United States) Al Unser Jr.	
1990	(Chile) Eliseo Salazar	
1991	(United Kingdom) Johnny Herbert	

==== Rookie of the Year ====
Year	Winner	Series	Ref
2000	(United Kingdom) Jenson Button	Formula One	
2001	(Colombia) Juan Pablo Montoya	Formula One	
2002	(Australia) Mark Webber	Formula One	
2003	(United Kingdom) Dan Wheldon	IndyCar Series	
2004	(United States) A. J. Allmendinger	Champ Car	
2005	(Portugal) Tiago Monteiro	Formula One	
2006	(United Kingdom) Lewis Hamilton	GP2 Series	
2007	(United Kingdom) Lewis Hamilton (2)	Formula One	
2008	(Germany) Sebastian Vettel	Formula One	
2009	(United Kingdom) Kris Meeke	Intercontinental Rally Challenge	
2010	(Japan) Kamui Kobayashi	Formula One	
2011	(United Kingdom) Paul di Resta	Formula One	
2012	(Switzerland) Mathéo Tuscher	FIA Formula Two	
2013	(France) Jules Bianchi	Formula One	
2014	(Russia) Daniil Kvyat	Formula One	
2015	(Netherlands) Max Verstappen	Formula One	
2016	(Germany) Pascal Wehrlein	Formula One	
2017	(Monaco) Charles Leclerc	FIA Formula 2	
2018	(Monaco) Charles Leclerc (2)	Formula One	
2019	(Thailand) Alexander Albon	Formula One	
2020	(Australia) Oscar Piastri	FIA Formula 3	
2021	(Australia) Oscar Piastri (2)	FIA Formula 2	
2022	(China) Zhou Guanyu	Formula One	
2023	(Australia) Oscar Piastri (3)	Formula One	
2025	(France) Isack Hadjar	Formula One	

==== Rider of the Year ====
Year	Winner	Series
2016	(Spain) Marc Márquez	MotoGP
2017	(Spain) Marc Márquez	MotoGP
2018	(Spain) Marc Márquez	MotoGP
2019	(Spain) Marc Márquez	MotoGP
2020	(Spain) Joan Mir	MotoGP

==== Williams Engineer of the Future ====
Year	Winner
2017	Martins Zalmans
2018	Owen Heaney
2022	Michael Preston
2023	David Crespo

==== Esports Driver of the Year ====
Year	Winner
2020	Sebastian Job
2021	Frederik Rasmussen
2022	James Baldwin

==== Esports Team of the Year ====
Year	Winner
2021	Coanda Simsport
2022	Team Redline

==== Gold Medal Award ====
Year	Winner
2021	Jean Todt
2022	Roger Penske
2023	Jackie Stewart
