= Fintray Hillclimb =

Coordinates: 57°14′15″N 2°14′45″W

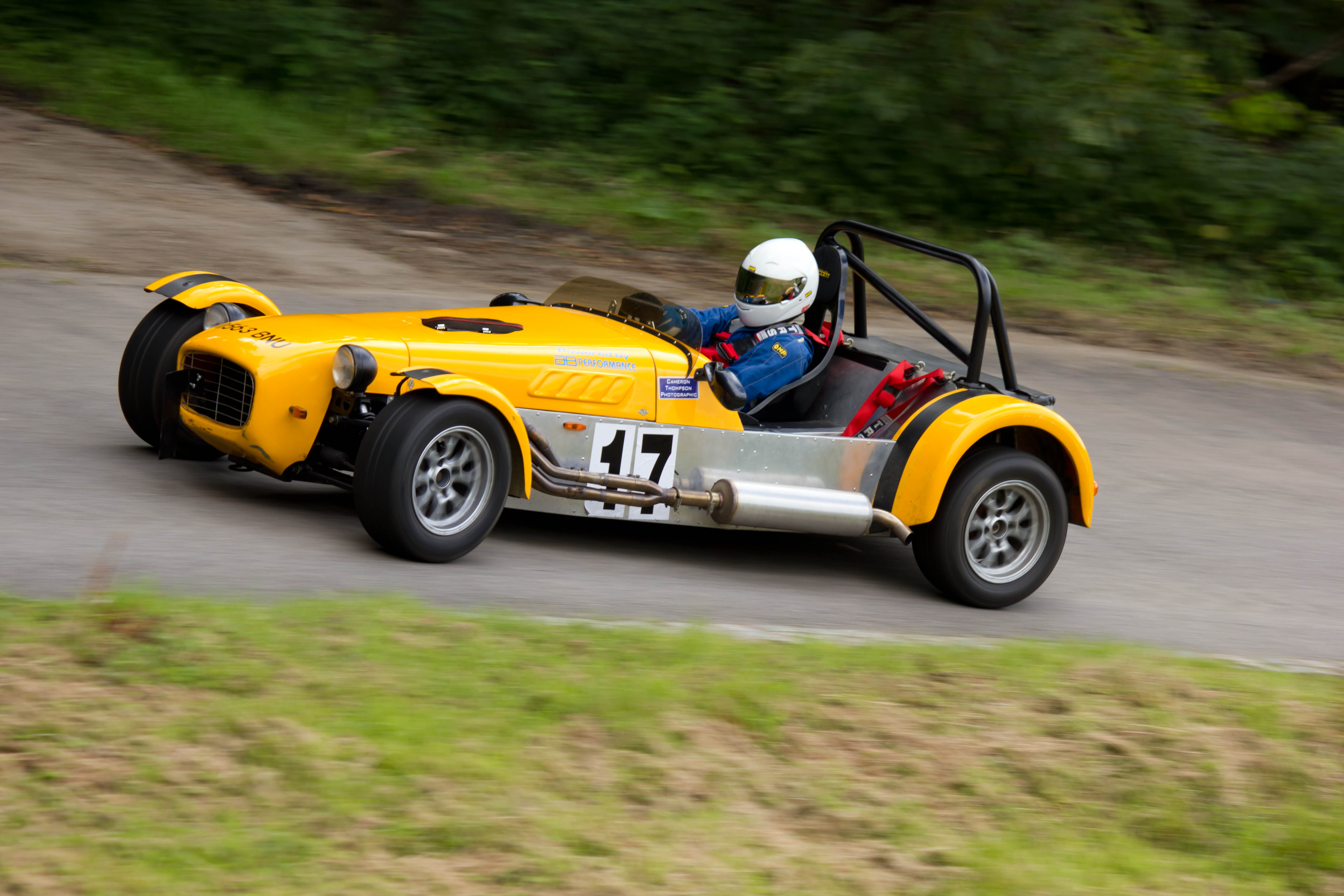
A car at the 2011 Hillclimb

Fintray House Hillclimb is a speed motorsport event held near Hatton of Fintray, in Aberdeenshire, Scotland. Each event is a separate round of the Scottish Hillclimb Championship and the Highland Speed Championship, sponsored by Plenderleath Runcie. The venue is a working farm for the majority of the year but Grampian Automobile Club (GAC) stage two, two-day events each year. The venue has been used since the 1960s, and continues to see record entries.

Initially run by Aberdeen & District Motor Club (ADMC), the event used to run as a National counter in the British Hill Climb Championship. Willie Forbes won here in 1967 driving a Lotus 35 in a record time of 28.11 sec on the 620-yard hill. Willie Forbes won the 1969 round in his Lola T142-Chevrolet in a time of 30.83 sec. In 1971 David Hepworth, Hepworth FF four-wheel-drive beat his existing record time of 29.9 seconds by four-tenths of a second and took another BTD.

In 1989, Autosport magazine said "Martin Bolsover's outright Fintray record had stood for so long people had almost forgotten it was there. His magical 1982 run was the only single sub-26s climb in the history of the hill, and, at 25.99s, only a shade under it too." On 25 June 1989 Roy Lane, Pilbeam MP58-1 DFL 4-litre, broke the longstanding record convincingly with a run of 25.72 sec at the British Championship meeting. The current track record of 25.28 was set in 2009 by Stewart Robb Jnr, breaking the previous record of 20 years' standing, set by Roy Lane in 1989. Stewart Robb Jr finally broke the hill record at Grampian MC's short, 725 yard hill at Fintray, near Aberdeen on Saturday 8 August 2009. Robb's father, Stewart Sr, was first inside the record – by a mere hundredth – aboard their 4-litre Pilbeam-Judd MP88. But on a day when nine class records were reset, his son applied the coup de grace on the last run of the day with a 25.28.

== See also ==
- Bo'ness Hill Climb
- Doune Hillclimb
- Forrestburn Hillclimb
- Rest and Be Thankful
