= List of listed buildings in Fintray =

This is a list of listed buildings in the parish of Fintray in Aberdeenshire, Scotland.

== List ==
Name	Location	Date Listed	Grid Ref. (Note: Sometimes known as OSGB36, the grid reference (where provided) is based on the British national grid reference system used by the Ordnance Survey. • "Guide to National Grid". Ordnance Survey. • "Get-a-map". Ordnance Survey.)	Geo-coordinates	Notes	LB Number (Note: Historic Environment Scotland assign a unique alphanumeric identifier to each designated site in Scotland, for listed buildings this always begins with "LB", for example "LB12345".)	Image
Disblair House				57°16′04″N 2°13′50″W	Category B	9149	Upload Photo
Hatton Of Fintray, West Lodge Including Boundary Walls And Gatepiers				57°14′19″N 2°15′50″W	Category C(S)	50503	Upload Photo
St Meddans				57°13′50″N 2°13′00″W	Category C(S)	13001	Upload Photo
Haughland Farmhouse Hatton Of Fintray				57°14′14″N 2°16′06″W	Category B	9146	Upload Photo
Fintray Parish Church, Hatton Of Fintray				57°14′25″N 2°15′58″W	Category B	9143	Upload Photo
Newmill Farmhouse				57°14′01″N 2°14′01″W	Category B	9151	Upload Photo
Milton Fintray Farmhouse				57°14′16″N 2°17′05″W	Category C(S)	9147	Upload Photo
Old Parish Church Burial Ground Hatton Of Fintray				57°14′21″N 2°15′56″W	Category C(S)	9144	Upload Photo
Morthouse, Burial Ground, Hatton Of Fintray				57°14′21″N 2°15′56″W	Category C(S)	9145	Upload Photo
Wester Fintray Farmhouse				57°14′15″N 2°18′55″W	Category B	9148	Upload Photo
Disblair Dovecot Disblair Policies St Meddans				57°16′05″N 2°13′29″W	Category B	9150	Upload Photo
Mill Of Fintray				57°14′23″N 2°16′40″W	Category C(S)	45853	Upload Photo

== Key ==
The scheme for classifying buildings in Scotland is:

- Category A: "buildings of national or international importance, either architectural or historic; or fine, little-altered examples of some particular period, style or building type."
- Category B: "buildings of regional or more than local importance; or major examples of some particular period, style or building type, which may have been altered."
- Category C: "buildings of local importance; lesser examples of any period, style, or building type, as originally constructed or moderately altered; and simple traditional buildings which group well with other listed buildings."

In March 2016 there were 47,288 listed buildings in Scotland. Of these, 8% were Category A, and 50% were Category B, with the remaining 42% being Category C.

== See also ==
- List of listed buildings in Aberdeenshire
