= 2008 British Hill Climb Championship season =

The 2008 Nicholson McLaren Engines British Hill Climb Championship season was the 62nd British Hill Climb Championship (BHCC) season. It was the last year in which Nicholson McLaren sponsored the championship, as MCL Motorhomes took over the championship sponsorship for 2009. The series was contested over 34 rounds, with the drivers' 28 best results counting for the championship. Scott Moran ended Martin Groves' dominance of the championship, by claiming the championship during round 27 at Gurston Down.

== Calendar ==
- The 2008 season consisted of seventeen meetings with two rounds at each. Times with a light blue background are hill records.

Round	Hill	Date	Winning driver	Time
1	(England) Prescott	27 April	Scott Moran	37.35
2	(England) Prescott	27 April	Scott Moran	37.69
3	(England) Barbon	10 May	Martin Groves	20.71
4	(England) Barbon	10 May	Scott Moran	20.50
5	(England) Harewood	11 May	Scott Moran	49.38
6	(England) Harewood	11 May	Scott Moran	49.76
7	(England) Gurston Down	25 May	Trevor Willis	31.05
8	(England) Gurston Down	25 May	Martin Groves	26.50
9	(England) Shelsley Walsh	1 June	Martin Groves	22.71
10	(England) Shelsley Walsh	1 June	Martin Groves	22.90
11	(England) Loton Park	8 June	Scott Moran	44.56
12	(England) Loton Park	8 June	Martin Groves	45.05
13	(Scotland) Doune	22 June	Martin Groves	41.22
14	(Scotland) Doune	22 June	Scott Moran	41.14
15	(England) Harewood	6 July	Martin Groves	1:01.52
16	(England) Harewood	6 July	Scott Moran	49.77
17	(Jersey) Bouley Bay	17 July	Scott Moran	38.82
18	(Jersey) Bouley Bay	17 July	Scott Moran	38.77
19	(Guernsey) Val des Terres	19 July	Martin Groves	28.25
20	(Guernsey) Val des Terres	19 July	Martin Groves	28.68
21	(England) Wiscombe Park	27 July	Martin Groves	35.09
22	(England) Wiscombe Park	27 July	Scott Moran	35.02
23	(Northern Ireland) Craigantlet	2 August	Scott Moran	40.57
24	(Northern Ireland) Craigantlet	2 August	Scott Moran	39.63
25	(England) Shelsley Walsh	17 August	Martin Groves	22.58
26	(England) Shelsley Walsh	17 August	Scott Moran	23.55
27	(England) Gurston Down	24 August	Martin Groves	27.41
28	(England) Gurston Down	24 August	Jos Goodyear	26.47
29	(England) Prescott	7 September	Martin Groves	43.92
30	(England) Prescott	7 September	Trevor Willis	39.65
31	(England) Loton Park	14 September	Martin Groves	44.74
32	(England) Loton Park	14 September	Martin Groves	44.53
33	(Scotland) Doune	28 September	Graeme Wight, Jr.	36.25
34	(Scotland) Doune	28 September	Martin Groves	36.01

== Championship standings ==
- Best 28 scores count towards the championship. Points are awarded to the drivers as follows:

Position	1	2	3	4	5	6	7	8	9	10	H.R.
Points	10	9	8	7	6	5	4	3	2	1	1

Pos	Driver	PRE1 (England)		BAR (England)		HAR1 (England)		GUR1 (England)		SHE1 (England)		LOT1 (England)		DOU1 (Scotland)		HAR2 (England)		BOU (Jersey)		VDT (Guernsey)		WIS (England)		CRA (Northern Ireland)		SHE2 (England)		GUR2 (England)		PRE2 (England)		LOT2 (England)		DOU2 (Scotland)		T. Pts	Drop	Pts
1	Scott Moran	1	1	2	1	1	1	3	2	2	2	1	2	2	1	5	1	1	1	2	2	2	1	1	1	2	1	5	2		2					271	6	265
2	Martin Groves	7	DNS	1	2	2	12		1	1	1	12	1	1	3	1	2	2	3	1	1	1	3			1	8	1		1	3	1	1	2	1	247		247
3	Trevor Willis	4	2	6	3	6	3	1	7	7	7	3	3	11	2	2	6	6	7	4	4	3	2	4	4	4	3	3	5	9	1	2	Spin	3	3	223	14	209
4	Roger Moran	3	5	4	4	3	6	5	5	8	6	4	6	3		7	5	4	5	5	3	5	8	3	2	5	6	2	4	4	8					181	3	178
5	Chris Merrick	6	4	3	5	5	5	9	3	6	4	5	5	6	4	11		3	2	6	7	6	5	2	3	7	9	6	3	5	4					170		170
6	Jos Goodyear			10	8	9	2	7	4	5	5	2	4				3		4	3	5	4	6			6	7	Fail	1		7	4	3			133		133
7	Paul Ranson			4	6	4	11	DNS	6	3	3	7	8	4	9	3	7	8	8		6	8	11			3	2	Fail	Fail			5	4	6	5	123		123
8	Basil Pitt	5			11	7	4	2	9	9	8	8	11			4	8	7	6			7	4			10	5	4	7	12	9	6	6			96		96
9	Deryk Young	2	8	7	7	8	8	Fail	12	4	DNS	6	7			8	9									8	4	7	6		11	7	5			76		76
10	Paul Haimes		10	12	10	11	7	4		12	11	10	10	5	5	6		11	Spin	7	8		7				12	Fail	9	8		8	7	7	7	63		63
11	Graeme Wight, Jr.													9			4									9				2	5	3	2	1	2	62		62
12	Tom New	11	6	8	12				11		10			8	7			9	10	8	10	9	9	Fail	DNS	12		8				10	8			34		34
13	Tim Wilson							6						10	6	9								7	6					7	10			9		29		29
14	Rob Turnbull	9	3					10	8								12	5	9			10				11										23		23
15	Mark Coley	10	7		9					10		11	12				11													6	6					18		18
16	Jonathan Rarity													7	8																			5	8	16		16
17	Will Hall															12								8	8					3		11			11	14		14
18	Stewart Robb, Jr.																																	4	4	14		14
19	Andrew Platt																							5	5									10	10	14		14
20	Robert Kenrick	8	11	11			9			11	9	9	9																				10			12		12
21	William Loughridge																							6	7											9		9
22	Alistair Crawford								10										11									9	8					12	Fail	6		6
23	Stewart Robb																																		6	5		5
24	Pat Roche																																	8	9	5		5
25	Eynon Price							8								10				12		11	12							10	12					5		5
26	John Chalmers																					12	10				11					9	9			5		5
27	Wallace Menzies													12	11			10		10	9						10									5		5
28	Mike Fitzsimmons																							9	9											4		4
29	Oliver Tomlin	12	9			10											10																			4		4
30	Andy Coley			9																																2		2
31	Nick Saunders																			9	Fail															2		2
32	James Blackmore					12	10																													1		1
33	James Brims														10																					1		1
34	Steve Owen														12															11		12		11		0		0
35	Paul Buckingham																			11	11															0		0
36	Neville Rollason																																11			0		0
37	John Bradburn																	12																		0		0
