= Martyn Griffiths =

British racing driver (born 1946)

Martyn Griffiths (born 18 April 1946) is a British racing driver, whose greatest success has been in hillclimbing. He has won the British Hill Climb Championship on five occasions (1979, 1986, 1987, 1990, 1991).

Sporting positions
Preceded by David Franklin	British Hill Climb Champion; 1979	Succeeded by Chris Cramer
Preceded by Chris Cramer	British Hill Climb Champion; 1986-1987	Succeeded by Charles Wardle
Preceded by Ray Rowan	British Hill Climb Champion; 1990-1991	Succeeded by Roy Lane
