= Wiscombe Park Hillclimb =

Hillclimb in Colyton, Devon, England

Coordinates: 50.73139°N 3.15402°W

Wiscombe Park
- Location: Near Colyton, Devon, England
- Time zone: GMT
- Opened: 1958
- Major Events: British Hill Climb Championship
- Hill Length: 1,000 yards (910 m)
- Hill Record: 31.77 (Matthew Ryder, 2024, British Hill Climb Championship)

Wiscombe Park Hillclimb is a British hillclimb, situated in Colyton, Devon. The course, which is 1000 yards (914 metres) in length — the same as Shelsley Walsh — was opened in 1958. The course was extended in 1961 when the record was held by Addicott in a Lotus at 49.3 secs. Wiscombe has been hosting rounds of the British Hill Climb Championship since the May meeting in 1962.

The outright hill record currently stands at 31.77 seconds, set by Matthew Ryder in July 2024.

== Wiscombe Park Hill Climb Outright Hill Records ==
Year	Driver	Vehicle	Time	Notes
1960	D. G. Addicott	Lotus Eleven-Climax	33.94 sec	18 September; 735 yard course.
1961	D. G. Addicott	Lotus	49.3 sec R	1,000 yard course.
1961	David Good	Cooper-J.A.P.	46.98 sec R	13 August
1962	T. Marsh	Marsh-B.R.M.	45.44 sec R	20 May
1962	Chris Summers	Cooper-Chevrolet 4,750 c.c.	44.64 sec R	14 October
1963	Peter Westbury	Felday-Daimler 2½-litre S/C	43.54 sec R	13 October
1964	Peter Westbury	Ferguson P99 4-w-d	42.53 sec R	17–18 May
1967	Bryan Eccles	Brabham BT18-Oldsmobile V8 3.5-litre	FTD	13–14 May
2006	Martin Groves	Gould-NME GR55B 3.5-litre	35.57 sec	30 July
2008	Scott Moran	Gould GR61X	35.02 sec	27 July
2012	Trevor Willis	OMS 25 Powertec	33.92 sec R	29 July
2023	Wallace Menzies	Gould GR59-M	32.93 sec R	30 July
2024	Matthew Ryder	Gould GR59-J	31.77 sec R	28 July

Key: R = Course Record; S/C = Supercharged.
