= 1949 British Grand Prix =

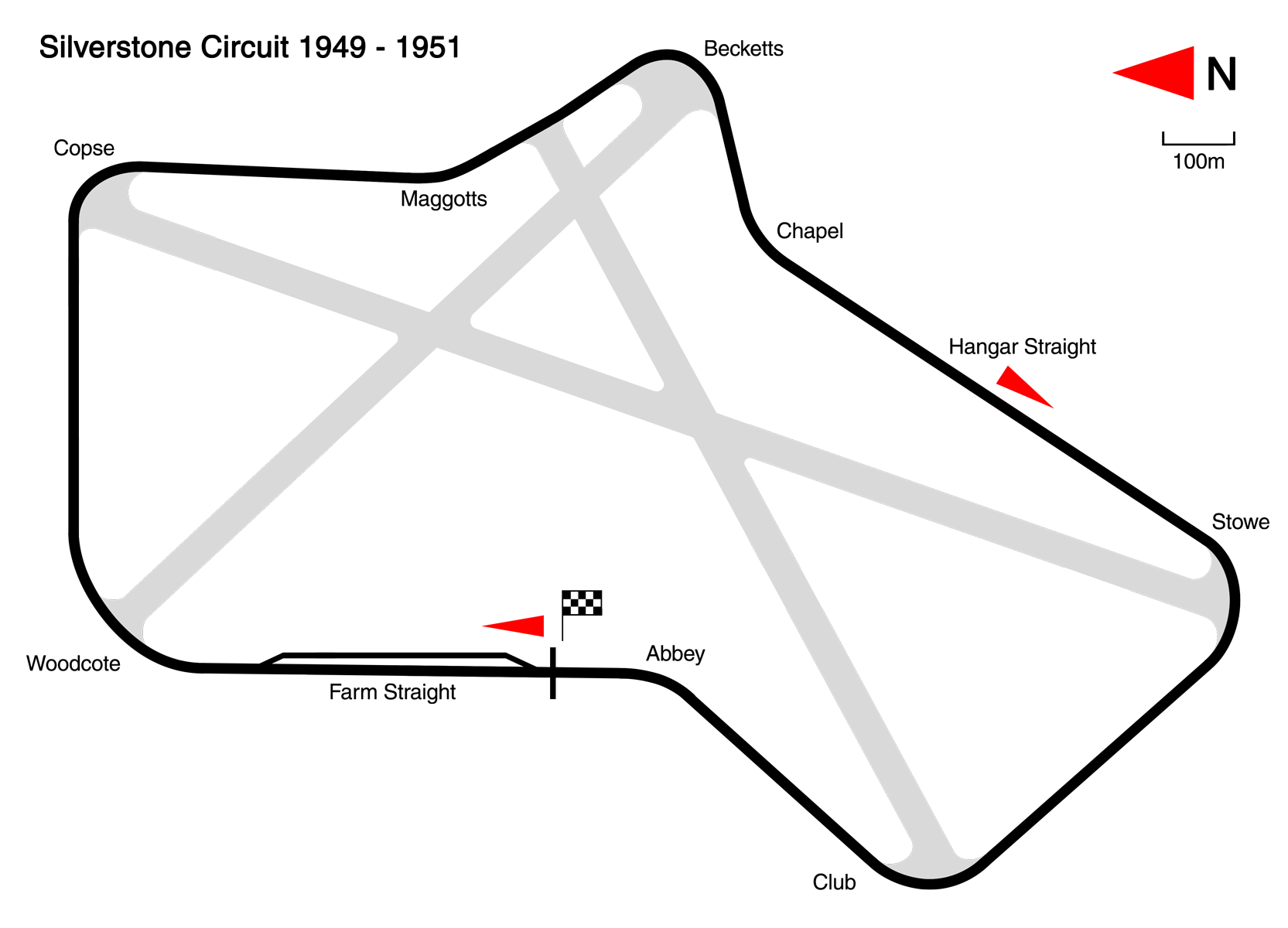

Race details
- Date: 14 May 1949
- Official name: RAC British Grand Prix
- Location: Silverstone Circuit; Silverstone, England
- Course: Permanent racing facility
- Course length: 4.828 km (3.000 miles)
- Distance: 100 laps, 482.8 km (300.0 miles)
- Attendance: 120,000

Pole position
Driver	(Italy) Luigi Villoresi	Maserati
- Time: 2:09.8

Fastest lap
Driver	(Thailand) B. Bira	Maserati
- Time: 2:10.4

Podium
First	(Switzerland) Emmanuel de Graffenried	Maserati
Second	(United Kingdom) Bob Gerard	ERA
Third	(France) Louis Rosier	Talbot-Lago-Talbot

The 1949 British Grand Prix was a Grand Prix motor race which was held at Silverstone on 14 May 1949. The race was won by Emmanuel de Graffenried driving a Maserati 4CLT.

== Background ==
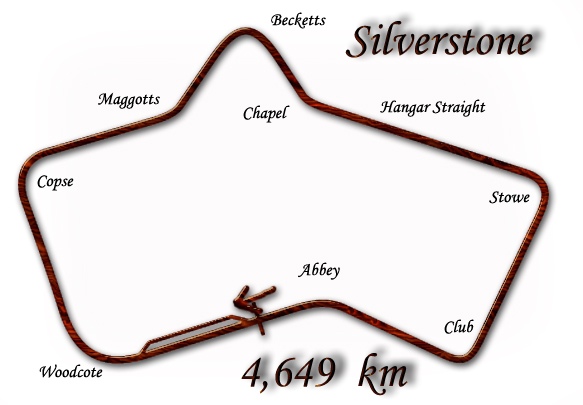
The layout used from 1950 to 1951 was the same as in 1949 except for bypassing the Club chicane

The 1949 Grand Prix was held just seven months after the 1948 event on a substantially modified layout. For 1949 the layout used perimeter roads only, no longer running down the runways. The layout was much the same as that used until 1973 with the exception of a tight chicane at what became Club corner in order to ensure cars were tested at both high and low speeds.

Also new for 1949 was the RAC being granted Grande Epreuve status for their race, officially adopting the title of British Grand Prix.

== Entries ==
Although a large entry was attracted, in spite of the increased importance placed on the event the entry did not include any true factory entries.

No	Driver	Entrant	Constructor	Chassis	Engine
1	(Thailand) B. Bira	Private	Maserati	Maserati 4CLT/48	Maserati L4s
2	(Switzerland) Emmanuel de Graffenried	Private	Maserati	Maserati 4CLT/48	Maserati L4s
3	(United Kingdom) Tony Rolt	Private	Alfa Romeo	Alfa–Aitken	Alfa Romeo L8
4	(United Kingdom) Raymond Mays (United Kingdom) Ken Richardson	T. Vandervell	Thinwall Special Ferrari	Thinwall Special Ferrari 125	Ferrari V12s
5	(United Kingdom) Bob Ansell	Private	Maserati	Maserati 4CM	Maserati L4s
6	(United Kingdom) Geoff Ansell (United Kingdom) Brian Shawe-Taylor	Private	ERA	ERA B	ERA L6s
7	(United Kingdom) Bob Gerard	Bob Gerard Racing	ERA	ERA B	ERA L6s
8	(United Kingdom) David Hampshire (United Kingdom) Billy Cotton	Private	ERA	ERA B	ERA L6s
9	(United Kingdom) David Murray	Private	Maserati	Maserati 4CL	Maserati L4s
10	(United Kingdom) Reg Parnell	Scuderia Ambrosiana	Maserati	Maserati 4CLT/48	Maserati L4s
11	(United Kingdom) Fred Ashmore	Scuderia Ambrosiana	Maserati	Maserati 4CLT/48	Maserati L4s
12	(Italy) Luigi Villoresi	Scuderia Ambrosiana	Maserati	Maserati 4CLT/48	Maserati L4s
15	(Monaco) Louis Chiron	SFACS Ecurie France	Talbot-Lago	Talbot-Lago T26C	Talbot L6
16	(France) Louis Rosier	Private	Talbot-Lago	Talbot-Lago T26C	Talbot L6
17	(France) Yves Giraud-Cabantous	Private	Talbot-Lago	Talbot-Lago T26C	Talbot L6
18	(United Kingdom) George Abecassis	Private	Alta	Alta GP	Alta L4s
19	(Belgium) Johnny Claes	Ecurie Belge	Talbot-Lago	Talbot-Lago T26C	Talbot L6
20	(United Kingdom) George Nixon	Private	ERA	ERA A	ERA L6s
21	(United Kingdom) Peter Whitehead (United Kingdom) Dudley Folland	Scuderia Ferrari	Ferrari	Ferrari 125	Ferrari V12s
22	(United Kingdom) Duncan Hamilton (United Kingdom) Philip Fotheringham-Parker	Private	Maserati	Maserati 6CM	Maserati L6s
23	(United Kingdom) Cuth Harrison	?	ERA	?	?
24	(France) Philippe Étancelin	Private	Talbot-Lago	Talbot-Lago T26C	Talbot L6
25	(United Kingdom) Roy Salvadori	Private	Maserati	Maserati 4CL	Maserati L4s
26	(United Kingdom) Anthony Baring	Private	Maserati	Maserati 4CM	Maserati L4
27	(United Kingdom) John Bolster	P.H. Bell	ERA	ERA B	ERA L6s
28	(United Kingdom) Peter Walker	P.N. Whitehead	ERA	ERA B	ERA L6s

== Practice and qualifying ==
Practice began on the Thursday before the race, although not all competitors arrived, some having travelled from the 1949 Roussillon Grand Prix in Perignan. Peter Walker set the fastest time on Thursday in 2 minutes 13.2. Luigi Villoresi was still tired, having arrived directly from Perignon, but was able to set second fastest time in 2 minutes 14.4, followed by Tony Rolt (2 minutes 15.8) and Cuth Harrison (2 minutes 16.4).

Times improved the following day as more of the international drivers had arrived. Villoresi would improve on his Thursday time to be fastest of all in 2 minutes 9.8, followed by Bira, who had also arrived from Perignan, in 2 minutes 10.2. The next fastest times set on Friday were by Emmanuel de Graffenried (2 minutes 13.6) and Bob Gerard (2 minutes 14.4).

The starting grid was arranged in rows of five, then four, then five, and so on.

=== Classification ===
Pos	No	Driver	Constructor	Time	Gap
1	12	(Italy) Luigi Villoresi	Maserati	2:09.8	–
2	1	(Thailand) B. Bira	Maserati	2:10.2	+ 0.4
3	28	(United Kingdom) Peter Walker	ERA	2:13.2	+ 3.4
4	2	(Switzerland) Emmanuel de Graffenried	Maserati	2:13.6	+ 3.8
5	7	(United Kingdom) Bob Gerard	ERA	2:14.4	+ 4.6
6	10	(United Kingdom) Reg Parnell	Maserati	2:14.8	+ 5.0
7	3	(United Kingdom) Tony Rolt	Alfa–Aitken	2:15.8	+ 6.0
8	24	(France) Philippe Étancelin	Talbot-Lago-Talbot	2:15.8	+ 6.0
9	23	(United Kingdom) Cuth Harrison	ERA	2:16.4	+ 6.6
10	8	(United Kingdom) David Hampshire	ERA	2:17.2	+ 7.4
11	17	(France) Yves Giraud-Cabantous	Talbot-Lago-Talbot	2:17.4	+ 7.6
12	18	(United Kingdom) George Abecassis	Alta	2:17.6	+ 7.8
13	6	(United Kingdom) Geoff Ansell	ERA	2:18.0	+ 8.2
14	21	(United Kingdom) Peter Whitehead	Ferrari	2:18.4	+ 8.6
15	15	(Monaco) Louis Chiron	Talbot-Lago-Talbot	2:19.2	+ 9.4
16	27	(United Kingdom) John Bolster	ERA	2:20.0	+ 10.2
17	11	(United Kingdom) Fred Ashmore	Maserati	2:20.8	+ 11.0
18	19	(Belgium) Johnny Claes	Talbot-Lago-Talbot	2:22.2	+ 12.4
19	4	(United Kingdom) Raymond Mays	Thinwall Special Ferrari	2:24.6	+ 14.8
20	16	(France) Louis Rosier	Talbot-Lago-Talbot	2:25.2	+ 15.4
21	26	(United Kingdom) Anthony Baring	Maserati	2:27.0	+ 17.2
22	22	(United Kingdom) Duncan Hamilton	Maserati	2:29.0	+ 19.2
23	25	(United Kingdom) Roy Salvadori	Maserati	2:29.2	+ 19.4
24	20	(United Kingdom) George Nixon	ERA	2:29.8	+ 20.0
25	9	(United Kingdom) David Murray	Maserati	2:30.4	+ 20.6

== Race ==
Bira made the best start in his Maserati, leading Villoresi's similar car by a clear two lengths at the first corner, followed closely by two more Maseratis, driven by de Graffenried, and by Reg Parnell taking advantage of starting directly behind the fastest drivers. Fifth was the ERA of Gerard. Villoresi overtook Bira for the lead on the third lap, as the pair pulled away from the rest of the field.

On lap 24, Bira regained the lead, and Villoresi began slowing, stopping for fuel at the end of lap 27 and dropping to fourth place behind Parnell moving into second place just slightly ahead of de Graffenried. Behind Villoresi was the Alta of George Abecassis in fifth and another Maserati, that of Fred Ashmore, in sixth. After thirty laps Bira had lapped every car outside of the top four. Not long after this Abecassis lost most of his exhaust pipe but continued on unfazed, while at the same time Villoresi stopped again, this time retiring with a loss of oil pressure.

Bira began suffering from brake fade, allowing Parnell to slowly close the gap but after 40 laps they were still around 40 seconds apart, with de Graffenried now around 20 seconds behind Parnell, followed now by Gerard and the Talbot-Lago of Philippe Étancelin. On his 48th lap Bira was unable to slow for the Club chicane, colliding with the straw bales and a barrel, damaging his suspension too much to continue, giving the lead to Parnell. At the halfway point (50 laps), Parnell lead de Graffenried by 23.6 seconds, followed by Gerard in third from Billy Cotton (who had taken over David Hampshire's ERA), and the Talbot-Lagos of Louis Rosier and Étancelin.

Parnell did not lead for long, however, as his axle oil plug popped out, losing him the lead. He would stop three more times over the next few laps and eventually retired after 69 laps due to a broken rear axle. So then after 60 laps the order was de Graffenried over three minutes ahead of Gerard, the soon to retire Parnell, Cotton, the two Talbot-Lagos, Ashmore and the Alta of Abecassis back up to seventh after losing a significant amount of time with carburettor trouble. Soon after Rosier took his Talbot-Lago into fourth place ahead of Cotton.

For the final 30 laps Gerard began to catch de Graffenried but was still some way back. His progress was helped by de Graffenried making a second stop for fuel on lap 85, but only managed to come within a minute of leading. So then de Graffenried won the race in a time of nearly four hours, 65 seconds ahead of Gerard who was himself a lap clear of third placed Rosier, the only driver to complete the race without stopping for fuel.

=== Classification ===
Pos	No	Driver	Constructor	Laps	Time/Retired	Grid
1	2	(Switzerland) Emmanuel de Graffenried	Maserati	100	3:52:50.2	4
2	7	(United Kingdom) Bob Gerard	ERA	100	+ 1:05.2	5
3	16	(France) Louis Rosier	Talbot-Lago-Talbot	99	+ 1 Lap	20
4	8	(United Kingdom) David Hampshire (United Kingdom) Billy Cotton	ERA	99	+ 1 Lap	10
5	24	(France) Philippe Étancelin	Talbot-Lago-Talbot	97	+ 3 Laps	8
6	11	(United Kingdom) Fred Ashmore	Maserati	97	+ 3 Laps	11
7	18	(United Kingdom) George Abecassis	Alta	96	+ 4 Laps	12
8	21	(United Kingdom) Peter Whitehead (United Kingdom) Dudley Folland	Ferrari	95	+ 5 Laps	14
9	6	(United Kingdom) Geoff Ansell (United Kingdom) Brian Shawe-Taylor	ERA	94	+ 6 Laps	13
10	19	(Belgium) Johnny Claes	Talbot-Lago-Talbot	92	+ 8 Laps	18
11	22	(United Kingdom) Philip Fotheringham-Parker (United Kingdom) Duncan Hamilton	Maserati	92	+ 8 Laps	22
Ret	4	(United Kingdom) Raymond Mays (United Kingdom) Ken Richardson	Thinwall Special Ferrari	82	Accident	19
Ret	10	(United Kingdom) Reg Parnell	Maserati	69	Transmission	6
Ret	25	(United Kingdom) Roy Salvadori	Maserati	65	Valve	23
Ret	9	(United Kingdom) David Murray	Maserati	64	Engine	25
Ret	27	(United Kingdom) John Bolster	ERA	53	Accident	16
Ret	28	(United Kingdom) Peter Walker	ERA	50	Brakes	3
Ret	1	(Thailand) B. Bira	Maserati	47	Collision	2
Ret	15	(Monaco) Louis Chiron	Talbot-Lago-Talbot	41	Engine	15
Ret	17	(France) Yves Giraud-Cabantous	Talbot-Lago-Talbot	39	Oil leak	11
Ret	26	(United Kingdom) Anthony Baring	Maserati	39	Water leak	21
Ret	12	(Italy) Luigi Villoresi	Maserati	36	Engine	1
Ret	23	(United Kingdom) Cuth Harrison	ERA	25	Engine	9
Ret	20	(United Kingdom) George Nixon	ERA	16	Supercharger	24
Ret	3	(United Kingdom) Tony Rolt	Alfa–Aitken	15	Rear axle	7
DNS	5	(United Kingdom) Bob Ansell	Maserati		Engine	

Grand Prix Race
Previous race: 1948 British Grand Prix	1949 Grand Prix season Grandes Épreuves	Next race: 1949 Belgian Grand Prix
Previous race: 1948 British Grand Prix	British Grand Prix	Next race: 1950 British Grand Prix
