= John Bolster =

British racing driver and journalist

- Nationality: (United Kingdom) British
- Born: 24 May 1910 Marylebone, London, England
- Died: 13 January 1984 (aged 73) Tunbridge Wells, Kent, England
- Starts: 2 Grands Prix
- Wins: 0
- Poles: 0
- Fastest laps: 0

John Vary Bolster, né Oldfield (24 May 1910 – 13 January 1984) was a British racing driver and journalist.

== Motor racing career ==
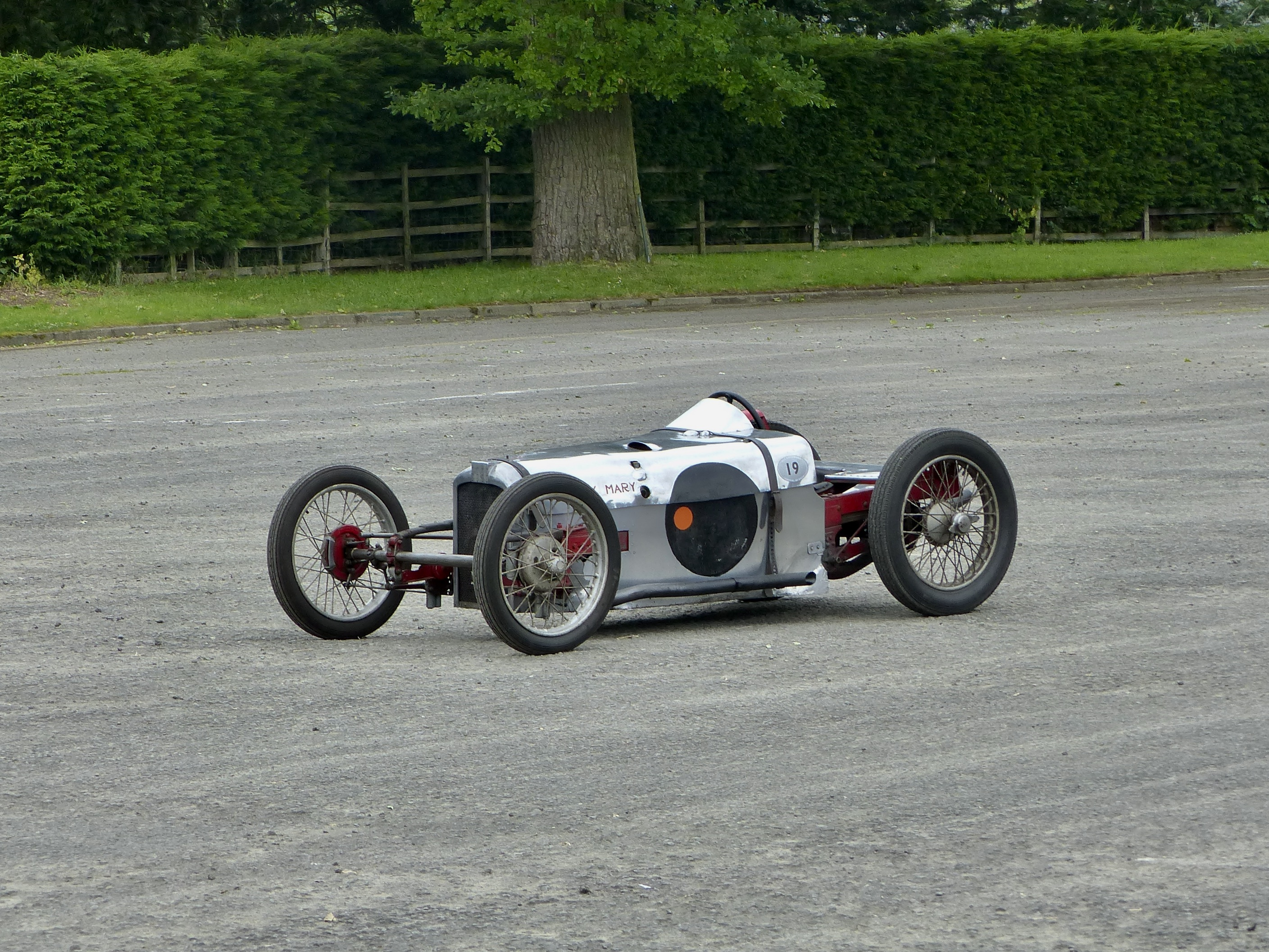
Bloody Mary 1, Chateau Impney Hillclimb

Bolster was successful in hillclimbing in the 1930s, with his Bloody Mary specials, built with his brother Richard. The first - Bloody Mary 1, powered by twin 1,000cc J. A. P. engines - first appeared in 1929 and was confined to sprints, while the more complex Bloody Mary 2 (with four such engines) made its first appearance at Shelsley Walsh in 1938, and Bolster raced it at circuits such as Brooklands and Crystal Palace.

After the War, Bolster abandoned Bloody Mary 2, putting two of the engines back into Bloody Mary 1, and was once more competitive in sprints and hillclimbs. For circuit racing, entrant Peter Bell recruited Bolster to drive Bell's ERA model R5B "Remus"; he took part in the British Grand Prix in both 1948 and 1949, in the former year finishing 6th after a comparatively trouble-free race (with one pitstop, to take on water), but in the latter he suffered a serious accident after clipping a straw bale.

He took part in the London to Brighton Run every year from 1934 to 1983, driving his 1903 Panhard.

== Journalism ==
While recovering from his British Grand Prix accident, Bolster was visited in hospital by journalist Gregor Grant, who suggested that the two found a weekly magazine to cover motor sport; the resulting publication, Autosport, was first published in August 1950, and Bolster worked for the magazine (as technical editor and road tester) until his death in 1984. His last contribution - a road-test of a Renault Fuego - was published after his funeral. His contribution to the magazine was honoured by the creation in 1985 of the John Bolster Award for Technical Achievement, one of the regular prizes handed out at the Autosport Awards.

Instantly recognizable by his handlebar moustache and deerstalker (the latter to help television crews identify him in crowded pit lanes), Bolster was a regular reporter for the British Broadcasting Corporation for its motor racing broadcasts.

== Personal life ==
As a farmer, Bolster was not allowed to sign up to fight in the Second World War, so he joined the Home Guard, as a member of which he became a bomb disposal expert. Bolster was married three times, his first wife Barbara dying in 1942, but survived by his third wife Rosemary (whom he married in 1970) and his daughter Annabelle.

== Books ==
- John Bolster (1950). Specials. G. T. Foulis & Company.
- John Bolster (1958). Motoring Is My Business. Autosport.
- Serge Bellu, trans. John Bolster (1979). Blue Blood: A History of Grand Prix Racing Cars in France. Frederick Warne.
- John Bolster (1979). Rolls Royce Silver Shadow. Osprey.
- John Bolster (1980). Lotus Elan and Europa (Collector's Guides). Motor Racing Productions.
