= Val des Terres Hill Climb =

Hillclimbing competition held in Guernsey

Coordinates: 49.4479°N 2.5355°W

Val des Terres
- Location: St Peter Port, Guernsey
- Time zone: GMT
- Major Events: British Hill Climb Championship
- Hill Length: 850 yards (780 m)
- Hill Record: 26.56 (Alex Summers, 2022, British Hill Climb Championship)

The Val des Terres Hill Climb is a hillclimbing competition held in St Peter Port, Guernsey. The course is 850 yards (777 m) in length. The track has hosted a round (latterly two rounds) of the British Hill Climb Championship.

== Val des Terres Hill Climb past winners ==
Year	Driver	Vehicle	Time	Notes
1946	G. Bainbridge	E.R.A.	50.6 sec	
1972	Richard Shardlow	Brabham BT21C-Vegantune twin-cam	36.29 sec R	
1973	Chris Cramer	March-BDA 2-litre	33.60 sec R	
1974	Richard Shardlow			
1975	Roy Lane			
1976	David Franklin	March 742-BMW 2.0-litre	33.87 sec	
1977	David Franklin	March 742 2.0-litre	33.22 sec	
1987	Martyn Griffiths	Pilbeam MP53-Hart 2.8-litre	30.94 sec R	
2008	Round 19 : Martin Groves	Gould	28.25 sec	19 July.
2008	Round 20 : Martin Groves	Gould	28.68 sec	19 July.

Key: R = Course Record.

== See also ==
- Bouley Bay Hill Climb
