= Hatton of Fintray =

Coordinates: 57.238°N 2.266°W

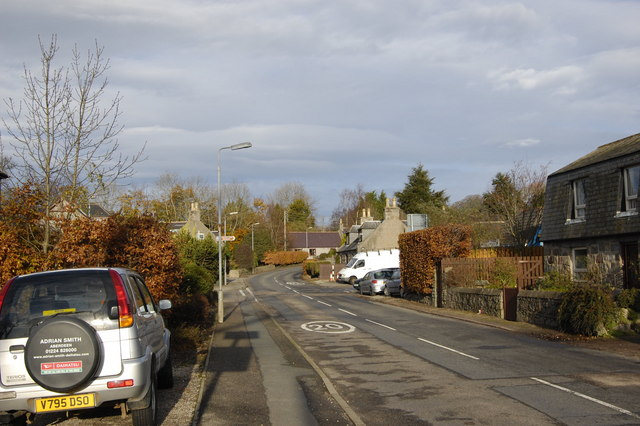
- Village centre

- Location within Aberdeenshire Location near the Aberdeen City council area
- OS grid reference: NJ 840163
- Council area: Aberdeenshire
- Lieutenancy area: Aberdeenshire
- Country: Scotland
- Sovereign state: United Kingdom
- Post town: Aberdeen
- Postcode district: AB21
- Dialling code: 01224
- Police: Scotland
- Fire: Scottish
- Ambulance: Scottish
- UK Parliament: Gordon and Buchan
- Scottish Parliament: Aberdeenshire East

Hatton of Fintray, commonly referred to as Fintray, is a village on the River Don in Aberdeenshire, Scotland, in the parish of Fintray. It was a textile village and its church dates from 1821, and there used to be a nearby ferry crossing the river.

== History ==
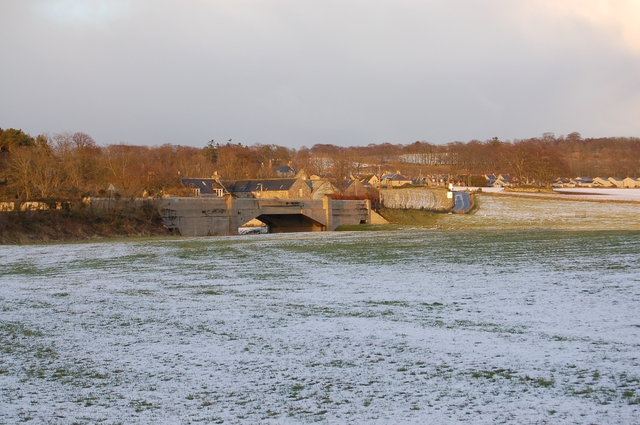
The bridge across the Don at Boat of Hatton, formerly the site of the ferry

The name of the parish is said to be derived from the Gaelic, Fionn-traigh, meaning "the white strand" an appellation descriptive enough of the greater portion of the parish which lies along the left, or north bank of the Don. The parish is bounded on the south by the river Don, which separates it from the parishes of Dyce, Kinellar and Kintore; by the parish of Keith-hall on the north and west; and by Newmachar on the east. The greatest length of the parish, in a direct line from south to north is 4.5 miles (7.2 km); and its greatest breadth, also in a direct line along the valley of the Don from east to west, is 5.5 miles (8.9 km); and its whole area is estimated to be 7,388 acres (29.90 km^{2}). It was larger up to 1948 when it had two portions transferred to Dyce and Kinellar.

A rare example of a morthouse is located in the churchyard. This was built to frustrate the activity of bodysnatchers.

It is mainly an agricultural parish with very little other manufacture. The village Hatton of Fintray is typical picturesque Donside village, little changed over the last 50 years, with the exception of the addition of a number of new houses. It has three churches in the parish, but only the most recent dating from 1821 in use. A good and well attended primary school. An excellent village hall, kept very much up to date, and also well used by the community. A bar and lounge named "The Northern Lights" was established in the village in 1962 and converted from an old established shop and printing works. It also has a joiners business, and a garage selling used vehicles.

The numbers within the parish is slowly increasing, however this has been controlled by the village via its Community Council in conjunction with a sympathetic planning authority. Hatton of Fintray remains one of the last bastions of tranquillity within a ten-mile (16 km) radius of Aberdeen.

== Events ==
There are several local events known throughout the Aberdeenshire region that originate in Hatton of Fintray. First of all the Sheltie Stakes is a family event run by the community to raise money for a charity. The first Sheltie Stakes took place in early September 1997 and there is a larger turn out every year due to the introduction of advertising throughout Aberdeenshire. The event still takes place in early September, usually the first Sunday of the month. Much of the work is done through the primary school to encourage the children to help in the community.

The Fintray Hillclimb (full title Fintray House Hillclimb) is a speed motorsport event held near Hatton of Fintray. Each event is a separate round of the Scottish Hillclimb Championship. The venue is a working farm for the majority of the year but Grampian Automobile Club (GAC) stage two, two-day events each year. The venue has been used since the 1960s and continues to see record entries. Initially run back in the 1960s by ADMC (Aberdeen & District Motor Club), the event used to run as a National counter in the British Hill Climb Championship. The current track record of 25.72 was set by Roy Lane in a Championship runoff back on 25 June 1989.

Stewart Robb Jr finally broke Roy Lane's long standing 25.72 hill record at Grampian MC's short, 725-yard hill at Fintray, near Aberdeen, Saturday 8 Aug 2009. Lane's old hill standard was set at 1989's British Championship meeting in his Pilbeam-DFL MP58. Robb's father, Stewart Sr, was first inside the record – by a mere hundredth – aboard their 4-litre Pilbeam-Judd MP88. But on a day when nine class records were reset, his son applied the coupe de gras on the very last run of the day with a 25.28.

== Sources ==
- Hatton of Fintray in the Gazetteer for Scotland.
