= Doune Hillclimb =

Motorsport venue in Stirling, Scotland

- Location: Doune, Stirling, Scotland
- Time zone: GMT
- Coordinates: 56.2087°N 4.0739°W
- Opened: April 1968
- Major Events: British Hill Climb Championship
- Hill Length: 1,476 yards (1,350 m)
- Hill Record: 34.21 (Alex Summers, 19th June 2022, British Hill Climb Championship)

Doune Hillclimb, Carse of Cambus, near Doune in the district of Stirling, Scotland, is the home of the only round of the British Hill Climb Championship currently to be held in Scotland (Bo'ness, Fintray and the Rest And Be Thankful have featured in the past). The course has been 1476 yards (1350m) in length since 1977. However, from the first meeting in 1968 until 1973 the start line was around 33 yards (30m) further back, and from 1974 until 1976 it was located beyond what is currently the first corner.

Prior to 1968, Lothian Car Club ran rounds of the British Hill Climb Championship at the Bo'ness Hillclimb from 1948 until 1967, when a house estate was built over part of the Bo'ness track. In 1967 the hillclimb track at Doune was designed by Ray Fielding and built with the first event taking place in April 1968.

The current outright record holder is Alex Summers, who set a time of 34.21 seconds on 19 June 2022. Video of a 35.05 second run by Jos Goodyear in his GWR Raptor can be seen here:

For many years, Doune Hillclimb hosted rounds of the Scottish Hillclimb Championship in April, June and September each year, and rounds of the British Hillclimb Championship in June and September. No meetings were held in 2020 or in April 2021 due to the global COVID-19 pandemic. The British Hillclimb Championship was scheduled to visit Doune in June 2021, but not in September of that year.

== Doune Hillclimb Winners: British Hillclimb Championship ==
Year	Championship Round	Driver	Vehicle	Time (s)	Date
1968		Sir Nicholas Williamson	Brabham BT21C	48.84	June
1971		Mike MacDowel	Palliser Repco V8 3-litre	50.52	20 June. R.A.C. Championship.
1971		Mike MacDowel	Palliser Repco	45.36 R	19 Sept
1986		Chris Cramer	Gould 84/3 Hart 2.8-litre	39.62	22 June
2005	Round 33	Martin Groves	Gould-NME GR55B 3.5-litre	37.20	18 September
2005	Round 34	Martin Groves	Gould-NME GR55B 3.5-litre	36.48 R	18 September
2006	Round 15	Martin Groves	Gould-NME GR5 3.5-litre	40.99 FTD	18 June
2006	Round 16	Roger Moran	Gould-NME GR61X 3.5-litre	41.88	18 June
2007	Round 15	Martin Groves	Gould-NME GR55 3.5-litre	36.93	17 June
2007	Round 16	Martin Groves	Gould-NME GR55 3.5-litre	36.00 R	17 June
2008	Round 13	Martin Groves	-	41.22	22 June
2008	Round 14	Scott Moran	-	41.14 FTD	22 June
2008	-	Graeme Wight Jnr	-	36.25	28 September
2008	-	Martin Groves	-	36.01	28 September
2009	-	Martin Groves	Gould GR55B	35.95 R	21 June
2009	-	Scott Moran	Gould GR61X	35.62 R	21 June
2010	-	Martin Groves	Gould GR55B NME	36.55	20 June
2010	-	Martin Groves	Gould GR55B NME	36.13	20 June
2011	-	Lee Adams	-	43.21	19 June
2011	-	Lee Adams	-	41.27	19 June
2012	Round 13	Lee Adams	GWR Raptor	41.90	17 June
2012	Round 14	Lee Adams	GWR Raptor	40.26	17 June
2013	Round 13	Trevor Willis	OMS 28	36.54	23 June
2013	Round 14	Trevor Willis	OMS 28	36.16	23 June
2013	Round 31	Alex Summers	DJ Firehawk	40.78	15 September
2013	Round 32	Alex Summers	DJ Firehawk	42.30	15 September
2014	Round 13	Scott Moran	Gould GR61X	34.99 R	22 June
2014	Round 14	Scott Moran	Gould GR61X	34.76 R	22 June
2014	Round 31	Scott Moran	Gould GR61X	35.16	21 September
2014	Round 32	Jos Goodyear	GWR Raptor	35.20	21 September
2015	Round 13	Alex Summers	Gould GR61X	37.28	21 June
2015	Round 14	Jos Goodyear	GWR Raptor	35.64	21 June
2015	Round 31	Alex Summers	Gould GR61X	35.65	20 September
2015	Round 32	Alex Summers	Gould GR61X	34.82	20 September
2016	Round 13	Scott Moran	Gould GR61X	35.51	19 June
2016	Round 14	Eynon Price	Gould GR59	43.14	19 June
2016	Round 31	Trevor Willis	OMS 28	36.12	18 September
2016	Round 32	Sean Gould	Gould GR59	38.07	18 September
2017	Round 11	Dave Uren	Gould GR55B	35.67	18 June
2017	Round 12	Trevor Willis	OMS 28	35.96	18 June
2017	Round 31	Wallace Menzies	Gould GR59	36.57	17 September
2017	Round 32	Wallace Menzies	Gould GR59	36.05	17 September

Key: R = Course Record; FTD = Fastest Time of the Day.

== See also ==
- Bo'ness Hill Climb
- Fintray Hillclimb
- Forrestburn Hillclimb
- Rest and Be Thankful Speed Hill Climb.
