= Ray Rowan =

British racing driver

Ray Rowan (born 1954) is a retired British racing driver. He won the British Hill Climb Championship in 1989, driving a Roman-Hart.

== Notes ==
Sporting positions
Preceded by Dave Harris	British Sprint Champion; 1981	Succeeded by Ken Ayers
Preceded by Roy Lane	British Sprint Champion; 1985	Succeeded by David Render
Preceded by Chris Wardle	British Hill Climb Champion; 1989	Succeeded by Martyn Griffiths
