= Martin Bolsover =

British racing driver

Martin Bolsover is a British racing driver. He won the British Hill Climb Championship three times driving a Pilbeam, his titles coming in successive years (1982–1983–1984). He was also well known for holding the sportscar record at Shelsley Walsh for twenty years, finally losing it to Nic Mann in 2004. Bolsover won the Autosport Award for "British Club Driver of the Year" in both 1982 and 1983.

== Notes ==
Awards and achievements
Preceded by Inaugural winner	Autosport; British Club Driver of the Year; 1982–1983	Succeeded by Rod Birley
Sporting positions
Preceded by James Thomson	British Hill Climb Champion; 1982–1984	Succeeded by Chris Cramer
