= 1957 Victorian Trophy Race =

The 1957 Victorian Trophy Race was a motor race staged at the Albert Park Circuit in Victoria, Australia on 24 March 1957. It was contested as a scratch race over 100 miles and incorporated a handicap held over 50 miles. It was the second race of the 1957 Australian Drivers' Championship.

The race was won by Lex Davison driving a Ferrari.

== Results ==
Pos.	Driver	No.	Car	Entrant	Handicap Pos.	Laps
1	Lex Davison	4	Ferrari	Ecurie Australie	4	32
2	Jack Brabham	5	Cooper FII Coventry Climax	J. Brabham	7	32
3	Doug Whiteford	6	Maserati 300S	D. Whiteford	8	32
4	Tom Hawkes	10	Cooper Holden	T. V. Hawkes	1	31
5	Len Lukey	11	Cooper Bristol	Lukey Mufflers	3	31
6	Bill Pitt	1	Jaguar D-Type	Mrs. G. Anderson	10	31
7	Eddie Perkins	16	Volkswagen Special		6	29
8	H. Firth	55	Triumph Special		11	28
9	G. Sandford-Morgan	28	MG		5	27
10	H. Thompson	54	HRG		9	26
11	R. Snodgrass	34	Talbot-Lago		12	25
12	Derek Jolly	22	Decca Special Coventry Climax	D. E. Jolly	2	23
DNF	W. M. Pile	19	MG Special		-	14
DNF	Stan Jones	2	Maserati 250F	Stan Jones Motors Pty. Ltd.	-	13
DNF	Les Murphy	27	MG Q		-	12
DNF	Ken Wylie	26	Cooper Mk.5 Norton	K. Wylie	-	10
DNF	E. Gray	8	Tornado	L. J. Abrahams	-	8
DNF	Ern Tadgell	15	Porsche Special	N. Hamilton	-	5
DNF	M. Nankervis	20	MG		-	3
DNF	A. Eyre	53	AME 500		-	3

== Notes ==
- Starters: 20
- Finishers: 12
- Fastest Lap: S. J. Jones (Maserati 250F) 1m 56.0s
