= Melbourne Grand Prix =

Melbourne Grand Prix may refer to:

- Australian Grand Prix, a Formula One auto race
- Melbourne Grand Prix Circuit, a motor racing track
- Melbourne Grand Prix (tennis), a Grand Prix tennis tournament played from 1982 through 1985
