= 1957 Tourist Trophy =

The 1957 Tourist Trophy may refer to the following races:

- The 1957 Isle of Man TT, for Grand Prix Motorcycles
- The 1957 Victorian Tourist Trophy, for sports cars held at Albert Park
- The 1957 Dutch TT, for Grand Prix Motorcycles held at Assen
