= 1950 New South Wales 100 =

Layout of the Mount Panorama Circuit (1938-1986)

The 1950 New South Wales 100 was a motor race staged at the Mount Panorama Circuit, Bathurst, New South Wales, Australia on 10 April 1950. It was organised by the Australian Sporting Car Club and was contested over 25 laps, a total distance of approximately 100 miles. The race was staged on a handicap basis with the first car, the MG J2/P of RW Fowler, scheduled to start 25 minutes before the last car, the Alta of Tony Gaze.

The race was won by Doug Whiteford driving a Ford V8 Special. Whiteford also achieved the fastest race time, for which he was awarded the New South Wales Road Racing Championship title.

== Results ==
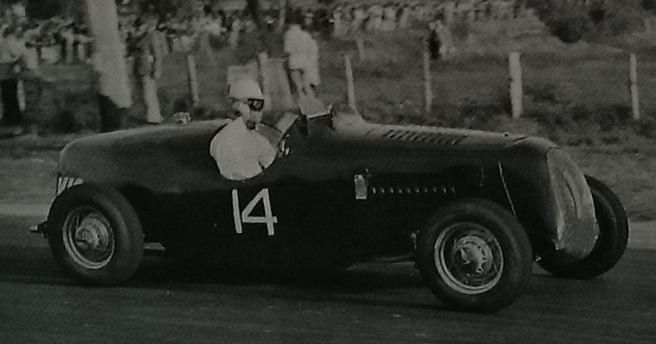
The winning Ford V8 Special of Doug Whiteford at the 1950 New South Wales 100

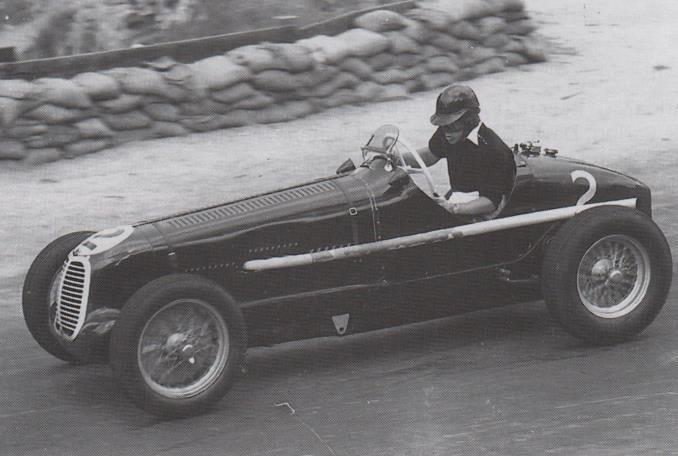
The Maserati 4C of David Chambers at the 1950 New South Wales 100

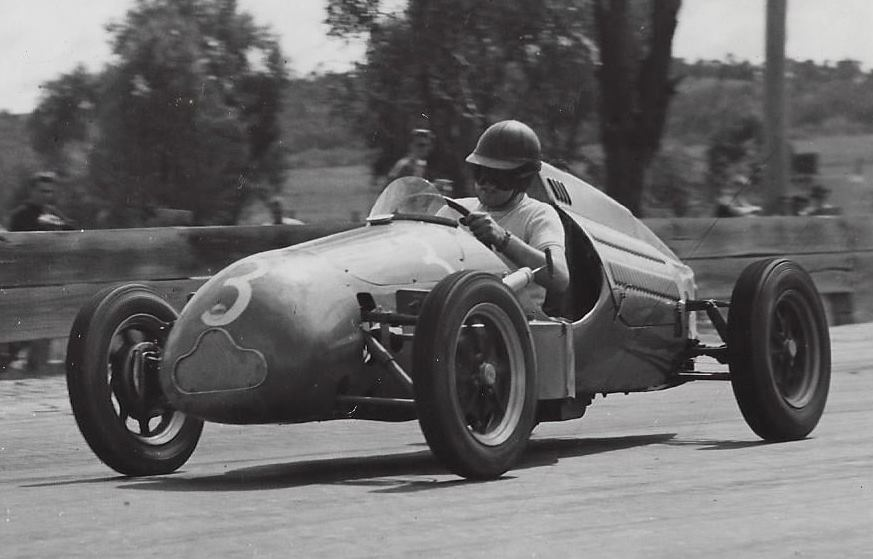
The Cooper Mk IV JAP of Keith Martin at the 1950 New South Wales 100

Position	Driver	No	Car	Entrant	Handicap	Race time / Remarks
1	Doug Whiteford	14	Ford V8 Special	D Whiteford	6:00	1:21:32
2	John Nind	30	MG Special	JP Nind	11:40	1:28:32
3	Stan Jones	24	HRG	S Jones	11:00	1:28:35
4	Jack Murray	9	Bugatti Ford s/c	JE Murray	6:00	1:23:19
5	George Pearse	33	MG TC	GW Pearse	12:30	1:30:12
6	George Reed	11	G Reed Special	GR Reed	6:00	1:24:08
7	Warwick Pratley	10	Ford Special	FW Pratley	6:00	1:24:31
8	Ron Edgerton	37	MG TC	RM Edgerton	13:20	1:33:06
9	Harry Monday	15	Mercury Special	HS Monday	7:00	
10	Tom Sulman	47	Sulman Singer	TN Sulman	13:20	
SR	David Chambers	2	Maserati 4C s/c	D Chambers	1:40	
SR	Curly Brydon	31	MG TC	AH Brydon	12:30	
SR	Ron Ward	48	MG TC	RS Ward	13:20	
SR	Phil Harrison	49	MG P-type Vauxhall	P Harrison	17:30	
SR	Don McDonald	43	MG TC	D McDonald	13:20	
SR	Bill Wilcox	54	Dodge Special	W Wilcox	7:00	
SR	John Crouch	27	MG TC Special	R Cobdon	11:40	
SR	Dan Landrigan	40	MG TC	DJ Landrigan	13:20	
SR	Bruce Riddell	45	MG TC	B Riddell	13:20	
DNF	Keith Martin	3	Cooper Mk IV JAP	Cooper Racing Car Distributors	1:40	Carburetion
DNF	Jack Saywell	4	Cooper Mk IV JAP	J Saywell	1:40	Oil pipe
DNF	Dick Bland	5	Ford Special	R Bland	6:00	
DNF	Bill MacLachlan	8	Bugatti Ford s/c	DA MacLachlan	6:00	
DNF	Clive Adams	17	Prad Ford V8	CE Adams	10:00	
DNF	Garry Coglan	19	MG TB Special s/c	G Coglan	10:00	
DNF	Ray Gordon	21	MG Special	RS Gordon	10:00	
DNF	Bill Patterson	22	MG Special s/c	GW Patterson	10:00	Gearbox
DNF	Ken Tubman	26	MG K3 s/c	KV Tubman	11:00	
DNF	Lex Davison	29	MG Special	Mrs AN Davison	11:40	
DNF	Irwin Luke	32	Bugatti Type 37	IC Luke	12:30	
DNF	Bill Burrows	35	MG TC	WI Burrows	13:20	
DNF	Tony Douglas	36	MG TC	AP Douglas	13:20	
DNF	Alan Ferguson	38	MG TC	AG Ferguson	13:20	
DNF	Alec Mildren	41	MG TB	AG Mildren	13:20	
DNF	John Moody	42	MG TC	JS Moody	13:20	
DNF	Gordon Stewart	46	MG L-type Magna	GT Stewart	13:20	
DNF	Tom Geoghegan	52	Ford 10 special	T Geoghegan	23:00	
DNS	Tony Gaze	1	Alta	FAO Gaze	0:00	Engine
DNS	GJ Thame	12	Jaguar XK120	GJ Thame	6:00	Fire
DNS	Laurie Oxenford	16	Alvis Mercury	LG Oxenford	7:00	Accident
DNS	Bill Ford	20	Hudson special	WD Ford	10:00	Broken crank
DNS	RM Reid	18	Terraplane	SJ Carpenter	10:00	Accident
DNS	Peter Fellows	18	Morris	P Fellows	11:00	
DNS	Peter Critchley	28	MG Special	P Critchley	11:40	
DNS	Alan John Bono	51	Rover special	AJ Bono	23:00	Engine
DNS	Ray Fowler	53	MG J2/P	RW Fowler	25:00	

=== Notes ===
- Organiser: Australian Sporting Car Club
- Attendance: 30,000 (estimated)
- Entries: 48
- Starters: 37
- Non Starters: 11
- Finishers: 10
- Still running when time limit for race expired: 9
- Winner's average speed: 71.5 m.p.h.
- Fastest lap: Jack Murray (Bugatti Ford): 3:08 (74.3 mph)
