= 1949 Australian Grand Prix =

- Formula Libre race

Race details
- Date: 18 September 1949
- Location: Leyburn Airfield, Leyburn, Queensland
- Course: Airfield circuit
- Course length: 6.92 km (4.3 miles)
- Distance: 35 laps, 242.2 km (150.5 miles)
- Weather: Sunny

Pole position
Driver	(Australia) Frank Kleinig	Hudson Special

Fastest lap
Driver	(Australia) John Crouch (Australia) Frank Kleinig	Delahaye 135MS; Hudson Special
- Time: 2'52

Podium
First	(Australia) John Crouch	Delahaye 135MS
Second	(Australia) Ray Gordon	MG TC Special
Third	(Australia) Arthur Rizzo	Riley Special

The 1949 Australian Grand Prix was a motor race held at the Leyburn Airfield in Queensland, Australia on 18 September 1949. The race was staged over 35 laps of the 7.0 kilometre circuit, which was laid out on the runways and taxiways of a World War II airbase located six kilometres north of the town of Leyburn. The total race distance was 150.5 miles (242.2 kilometres).

The race is recognised by the Confederation of Australian Motor Sport as the fourteenth Australian Grand Prix. It was the first Australian Grand Prix to be held in Queensland and the first to feature a mass start of the entire grid. The 1949 Australian Grand Prix was the first Australian Grand Prix to be held with grid positions decided by practice times. The race, which was organised by the Queensland Motor Sporting Club, attracted a crowd of approximately 40,000 people.

John Crouch won the race driving a Delahaye 135MS. Ray "Laddie" Gordon (MG TC Special) finished second ahead of third placed Arthur Rizzo (Riley Special).

== Event overview ==
The 1949 Australian Grand Prix was hosted at an abandoned Royal Australian Air Force (RAAF) airbase, Leyburn Airfield in Leyburn by the Queensland Motor Sporting Club. The race took place on the old runways of the decommissioned base in the Darling Downs. The use of airfields for the hosting of Grand Prix events had become common following World War II. Victoria hosted the 1948 Australian Grand Prix at an airfield in Point Cook in the previous year.

The Queensland Motor Sporting Club decided that the official practice on the circuit for the 1949 Australian Grand Prix was to be held on 11 and 17 September. The town of Leyburn has a long history of motor racing which started with the 1949 Australian Grand Prix which coincided with the start of Leyburn Sprints.

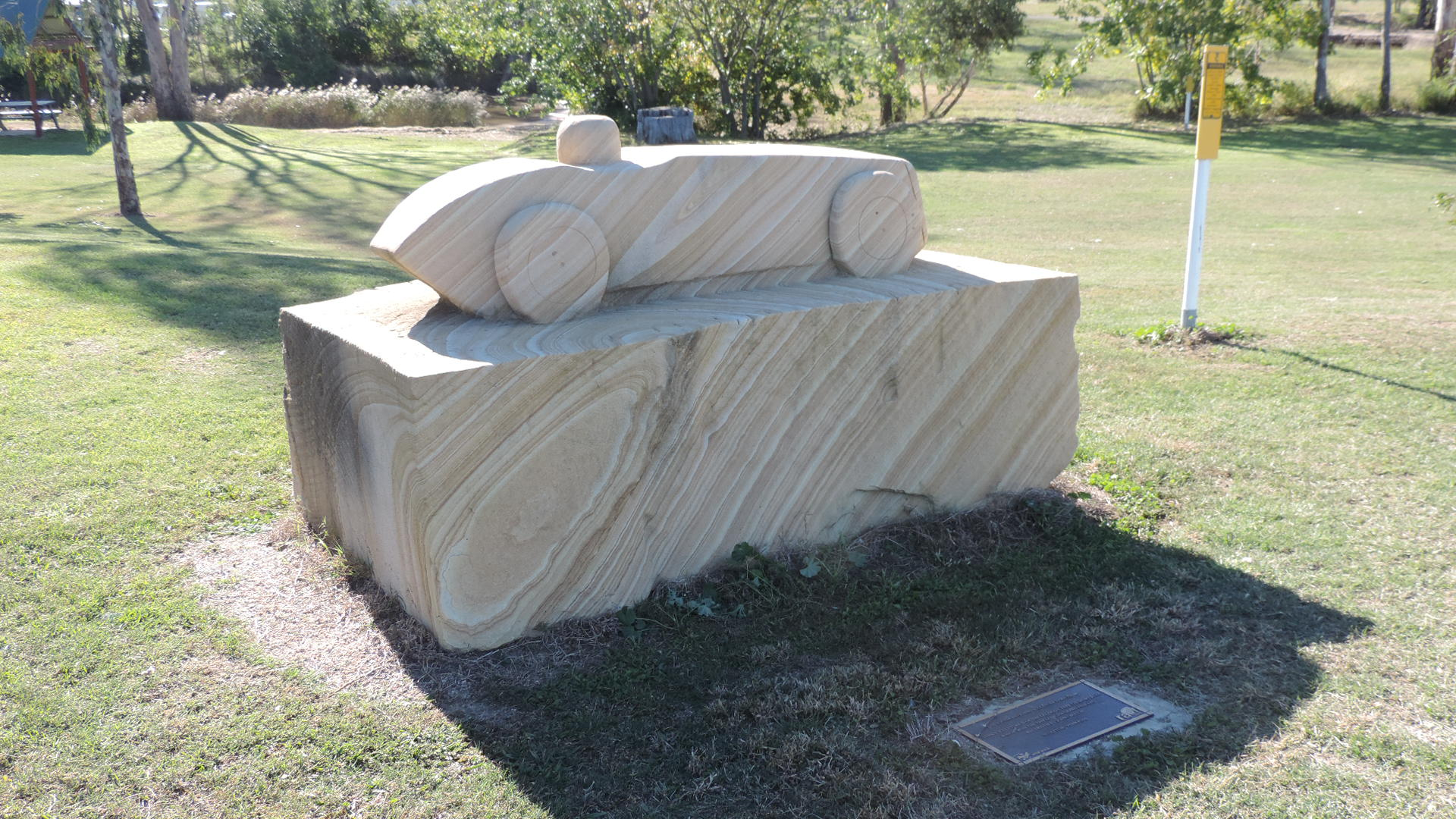
Vern Foss sculpture of the winning car.

There was a total of 28 competitors for the first Queensland held Grand Prix around the 6.92 km track. Out of the 28 cars that began the race only 11 finished. The eventual winner of the Grand Prix was John Crouch, a motor sales manager in his private life. The 1949 race was the fourth Australian Grand Prix in which Crouch had participated and he won the race driving a blue Delahaye which he had acquired after the war. Crouch finished the Grand Prix with a time that was 5 minutes (approximately 2 laps) faster than second placed Ray Gordon who drove an MG TC Special. Behind Gordon finishing in third place was Arthur Rizzo in the Riley Special, followed by Peter Critchley in the MG TB Special in fourth. Alan Larsen finished the 1949 Australian Grand Prix in fifth position driving the Cadillac Special.

The crowd was projected to be an estimated 20,000 people. The crowd on the day of the 1949 Australian Grand Prix exceeded expectations with an overall estimation of 30,000 spectators in attendance. The spectators for the event contributed to the £6,000 (an estimated £217,490 or $397,300 AUD in 2021) accrued in gate ticket sales.

Prior to the commencement of the main race, the 1949 Australian Grand Prix, the 28 cars participating did one lap of the course while three Mustangs flew over the airfield performing an aerobatic display.

The Grand Prix featured a massed start rather than a handicap start, the latter format having been used for each race from 1931 to 1948.

The 1949 Australian Grand Prix and other events on the programme for the day took place without the occurrence of any crashes despite the heavily gravelled nature of Leyburn Airfield.

The prize money for the 1949 Australian Grand Prix was a total purse of £645(an estimated value of £23,380 or $42,709 AUD in 2021). With the winner, John Crouch, receiving £150 (an estimated value of £5,437 or $9,932 AUD in 2021) for his winning performance in the race. Ray Gordon who finished in second place received £75 (an estimated value of £2,718 or $5,002 AUD in 2021). Arthur Rizzo received £50 for finishing in third place (an estimated value of £1,812 or $3,335 AUD). Peter Critchley won £35 (an estimated £1,268 or $2,335 AUD) for finishing the Grand Prix in fourth place. Alan Larsen won (an estimated £7245 or $1,334 AUD) for finishing the race in fifth place. Crouch's winning time for the 150-mile circuit was 1 hour 49 minutes and 25 seconds at an average speed of 82.5 miles an hour.

== Public reception ==
It was assumed a crowd of 20,000 spectators would attend the Queensland Motor Sporting Club organised Grand Prix on 18 September 1949. The crowd exceeded expectations with a total of 30,000 spectators, with some accounts stating 50,000 in attendance to watch John Crouch win the Grand Prix in his 10th attempt at claiming line honours.

The full day programme had been finalised on 30 July 1949, with both motor car and cycle racing to take place on the day of the 1949 Australian Grand Prix on 18 September. The first event of the day was scheduled to commence at 10 a.m.

Despite the high attendance of the 1949 Australian Grand Prix from the spectators, the competitors preferred competing on a non-airfield track such as the track in the following 1950 Australian Grand Prix, at Nuriootpa.

The crowd at Leyburn Airfield for the Australian Grand Prix surrounding the track stretched four people deep for an estimated 2 and a half to three miles (Equating to 4.0 km to 4.8 km).

Periodic encroachment on to the track resulted in a late start to the racing programme that consisted of 6 events and subsequent non-completion of the final event. Police vehicles equipped with speaker systems were used in an attempt to keep the spectators off the track throughout the course of the day of racing. An estimated total of six thousand cars were parked on the grounds of Leyburn Airfield with seven planes landing in the morning transporting spectators to the event.

The significant number of people in attendance necessitated a variety of seating methods including bales of wool and large petrol drums on the backs of delivery trucks.

The Queensland Motor Sporting Club booked out all of the available accommodation within a total radius of 40 miles (Approximately 64 km) of Leyburn for any competitors travelling from the southern parts of Australia, with any left over accommodation available for members of the public to apply to the club for.

== Leyburn Airfield track ==
The 1949 Australian Grand was hosted at former airbase and RAAF aerodrome, Leyburn Airfield. The airfield is located in the south eastern Darling Downs region of Queensland, at an approximate distance of 37 kilometres from Toowoomba.

The airfield was selected to host the 1949 Australian Grand Prix due to its features conducive to a racing format. The course was roughly triangular and consists of two main racing straights in the form of runways. The two runways are both 150 feet wide (approximately 1.63 km by 45.7m) and connected by a 50 foot wide (approximately 15.24m) perimeter track.

The airfield was tar-sealed and despite the undulating country of the Darling Downs, was almost on flat ground. The flat nature of Leyburn Airfield meant that an unrestricted view for spectators around the entire circuit from all of the vantage points was permitted.

Due to the runways straight disposition, fast speeds were attainable with great safety. On the long straight of 7,000 feet (approximately 2.14 km) speeds were estimated to reach maximums of between 130 and 140 miles per hour (approximately between 209 kilometres per hour to 225 kilometres per hour).

== Competing cars ==
=== Delahaye ===
John Crouch contested the race in a Delahaye 135MS. He finished the first lap in second place behind leader Frank Kleinig who was driving a Hudson Special. Crouch led the race at the end of the seventeenth lap, a whole lap ahead of Kleinig in second place. He went on to win the race in 1h 49m 25.2s in what was to be the first and only Australian Grand Prix win for a Delahaye.

=== Studebaker ===
A Studebaker Special was raced by Charlie Whatmore in the 1949 Australian Grand Prix. Whatmore was unable to complete the race retiring early due to reporting a leaking fuel tank, only completing a total of 10 laps out of the 35.

=== MG ===
An MG TC was raced in the 1949 Australian Grand Prix by 2nd-place finisher, Ray Gordon who finished with a time of 1h 54m 12.2s.

Ray Gordon was in third position after the seventeenth lap, a lap and a half behind the leader.

In addition to the MG TC Midget, MG also raced another model of their vehicles in, the MG Magna. The Magna was driven by Ken Tubman who was forced to retire during the 1949 Australian Grand Prix after completing 12 laps.

Many competitors who raced in MG manufactured vehicles were forced to retire during the 1949 Australian Grand Prix. Les Taylor, Vic Johnson, John Nind, Garry Coglan, Dick Cobden and George Pearse all competed in MG vehicles and were forced to retire during the race. None of which completed more than 27 laps, achieved by Vic Johnson. With George Pearse only managing to complete 2 laps in his MG TB.

=== Hudson ===
In the 1949 Australian Grand Prix a Hudson Special was driven by Frank Kleinig who started the race on pole position. The time for Kleing's first lap was 3 minutes and 1 second or 83.5 miles per hour (approximately 134.4 kilometres per hour). Kleinig continued to lead Crouch after seven laps, but in the eighth lap was required to pit due to the need for an engine adjustment. Following his engine adjustment to the Hudson Special, Frank Kleinig was more than a lap behind Crouch.

The Hudson Special was not able to finish the race, being forced into pit lane on two occasions with engine fan problems before being forced to retire after completing 21 laps.

=== Riley Special ===
Arthur Rizzo drove a Riley Special. He was one of the eleven competitors out of the 28 that started to complete the race, finishing in third place. Rizzo's time for the race was 1h 56m 56.8s.

== Retirements ==
Throughout the 35 lap duration of the 1949 Australian Grand Prix many of the racers were forced to retire for a number of mechanical reasons.

Keith Thallon driving the Jaguar SS100 was forced to retire after completing 10 laps due to trouble with a main bearing. Arthur Bowes retired after 5 laps in the Hudson Special as a result of engine problems. Snow Sefton was forced to retire after completing 11 laps in the Strathpine Special due to an overheating issue. Rex Law was forced to retire from the race after 8 laps in the Buick Special due to overwhelming brake issues. Charlie Whatmore after completing 10 laps was forced to retire due to a leaking fuel tank that he had incurred in the Studebaker Special. Dick Reed who raced in the G Reed Ford Special after blowing a tyre at a corner during the 26th lap of the race.

== Classification ==
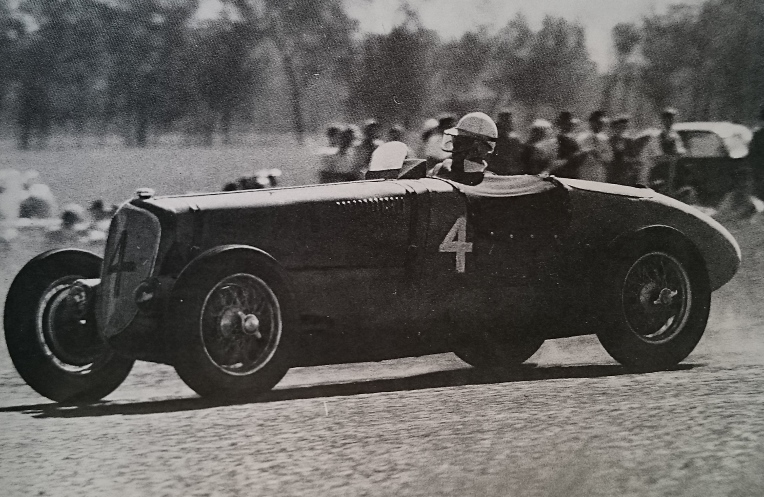
The race winning Delahaye 135MS of John Crouch at the 1949 Australian Grand Prix

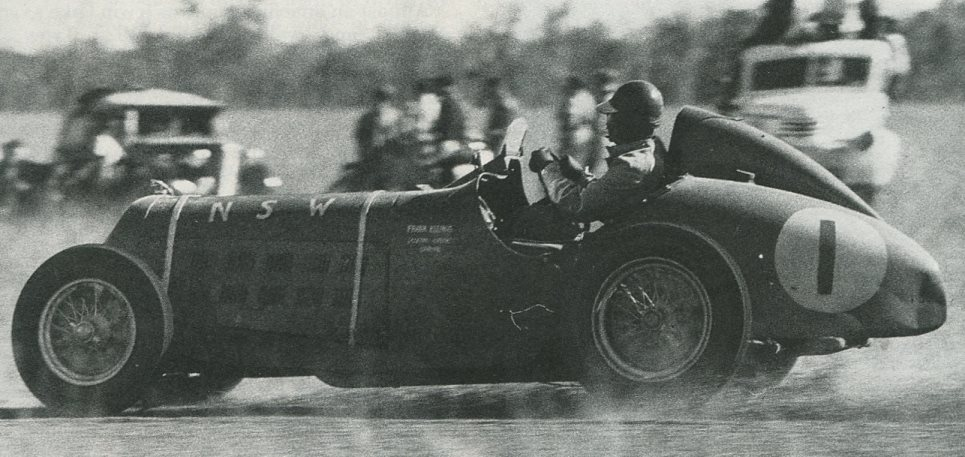
The Hudson Special of Frank Klienig contesting the race. Klienig set equal fastest lap but did not finish the race.

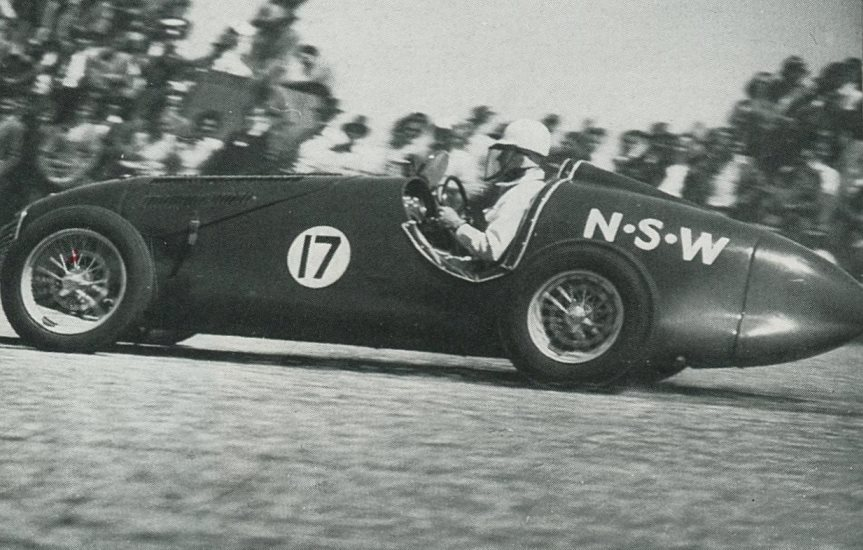
The MG TC Special of Dick Cobden which also retired from the race.

Pos	No.	Driver	Car / engine	Laps	Time
1	4	(Australia) John Crouch	Delahaye 135MS / Delahaye 3.6L	35	1h 49m 25.2s
2	20	(Australia) Ray Gordon	MG TC Special / MG s/c 1.3L	35	1h 54m 12.2s
3	8	(Australia) Arthur Rizzo	Riley Special / Riley 1.5L	35	1h 56m 56.8s
4	19	(Australia) Peter Critchley	MG TB Special / MG 1.3L	35	1h 59m 40s
5	7	(Australia) Alan Larsen	Cadillac Special / Cadillac 5.7L	35	1h 59m 53s
6	29	(Australia) Curley Brydon	MG TC Special / MG 1.3L	35	2h 00m 08s
7	38	(Australia) Irwin Luke	Bugatti Type 37 / Bugatti	35	2h 07m 07.4s
8	24	(Australia) Theo Trevethan	Ford V8 Special / Ford 3.9L	35	2h 11m 14.4s
9	40	(Australia) H. McGuire	MG TC / MG 1.3L	35	2h 16m 53s
10	32	(Australia) Col Robinson	MG TC / MG 1.3L	35	2h 20m 59.6s
11	33	(Australia) Jack Wright	Ford V8 Special / Ford 4.0L	35	2h 24m 36.8s
Ret	36	(Australia) Vic Johnson	MG TC / MG 1.3L	27	
Ret	2	(Australia) Dick Bland	G Reed Ford Special / Ford 4.0L	26	Puncture
Ret	1	(Australia) Frank Kleinig	Hudson Special / Hudson 4.4L	21	
Ret	21	(Australia) John Nind	MG TB Special / MG 1.3L	20	
Ret	18	(Australia) Garry Coglan	MG TC Special / MG 1.3L	16	
Ret	34	(Australia) Ken Tubman	MG Magna / MG s/c 1.1L	12	
Ret	10	(Australia) Snow Sefton	Strathpine Special	11	Overheating
Ret	11	(Australia) Charlie Whatmore	Studebaker Special	10	Fuel leak
Ret	23	(Australia) Les Taylor	MG TC Special / MG 1.3L	10	
Ret	15	(Australia) Keith Thallon	Jaguar SS100 / SS 3.6L	10	Wheel bearing
Ret	25	(Australia) Doug McDonald	Bugatti / Dodge	9	
Ret	9	(Australia) Keith Saunders	Cadillac Special	8	
Ret	5	(Australia) Rex Law	Buick Special	8	Breaks
Ret	17	(Australia) Dick Cobden	MG TC Special / MG 1.4L	6	
Ret	3	(Australia) Arthur Bowes	Hudson Special / Hudson	5	Engine
Ret	6	(Australia) Ross Gray	GK Ford Special / Ford 4.0L	4	
Ret	22	(Australia) George Pearse	MG TB / MG 1.3L	2	

=== Notes ===
- Fastest lap: John Crouch and Frank Kleinig – 2'52, 90 mph (144.8 km/h)

=== Handicap award ===
A concurrent handicap award was won by Luke (Bugatti Type 37) with an adjusted time of 1 hour 39 minutes 7.4 seconds. Second on handicap was Gordon from Brydon, Critchley and Crouch .

Preceded by 1948 Australian Grand Prix	Australian Grand Prix; 1949	Succeeded by 1950 Australian Grand Prix
