= 1958 Victorian Tourist Trophy =

Motor racing meeting

The 1958 Victorian Tourist Trophy was a motor race staged at the Albert Park Circuit in Victoria, Australia on 23 November 1958. It was restricted to open or closed Sports Cars complying with CAMS Appendix C regulations. The race was contested over 32 laps of the 3.125 mile circuit, a total distance of approximately 100 miles. It was the feature race on the first day of a two-day race meeting organised by the Light Car Club of Australia.

The race was won by Doug Whiteford driving a Maserati 300S.

== Results ==
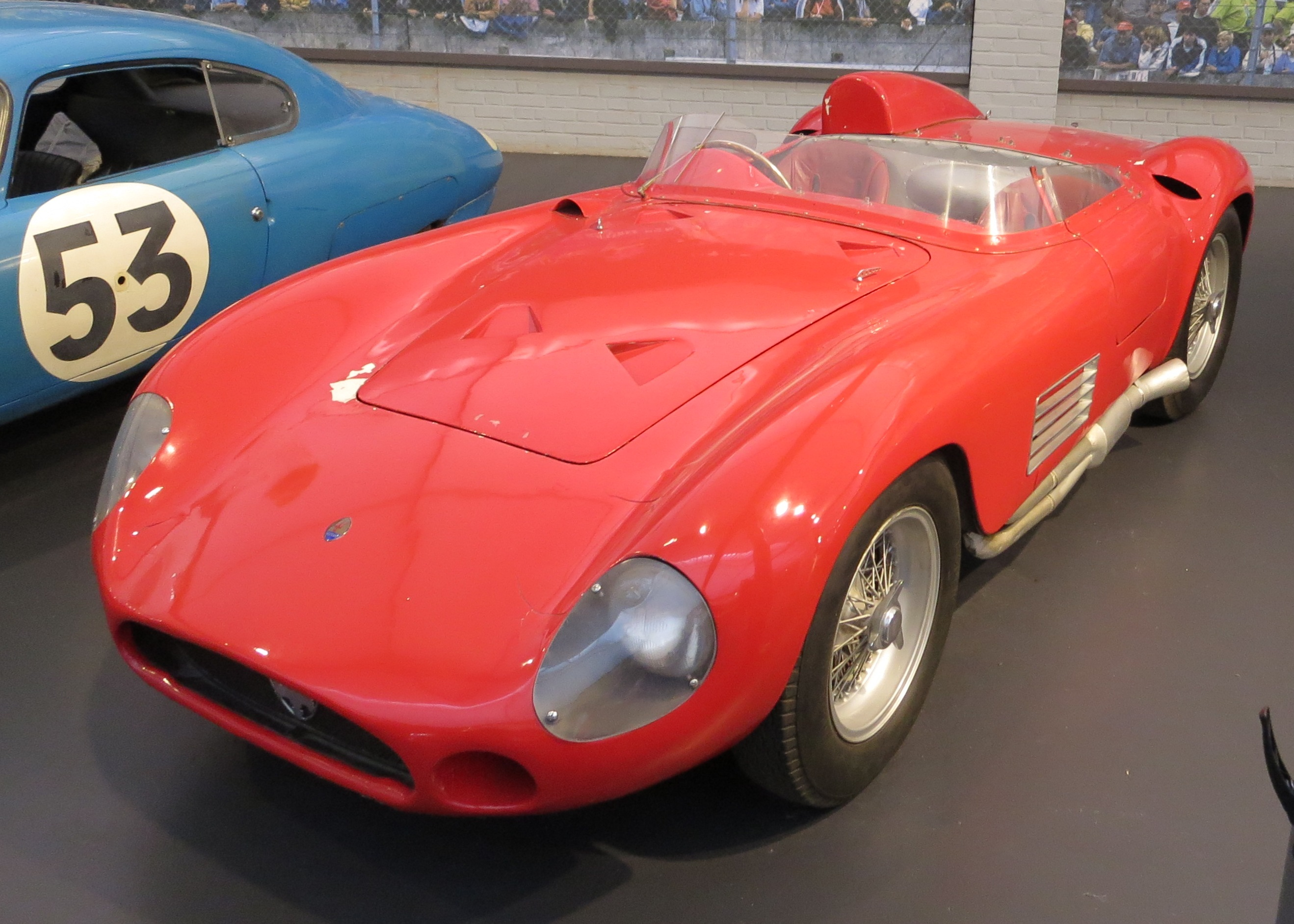
Doug Whiteford won the race driving a Maserati 300S similar to the example pictured

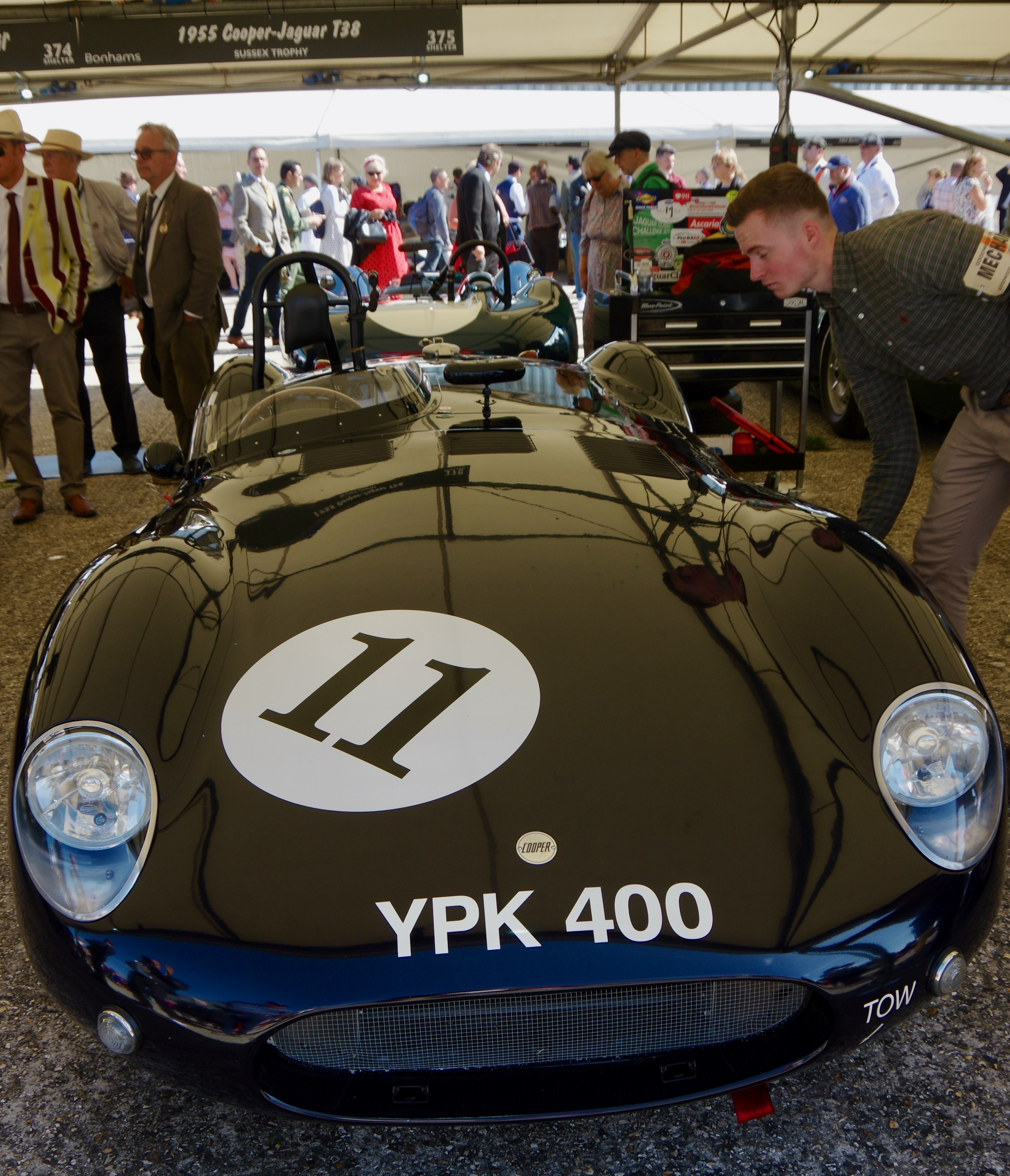
Ron Phillips placed second driving a Cooper T38 Jaguar similar to the example pictured

Position	Driver	No.	Car	Entrant	Class	Class pos.	Laps
1	Doug Whiteford	26	Maserati 300S	D. Whiteford	2001 cc to 3000 cc	1	32
2	Ron Phillips	56	Cooper T38 Jaguar	J. and R. Phillips	Open Class	1	32
3	Bill Pitt	22	Jaguar D-Type	G. Anderson	Open Class	2	32
4	Derek Jolly	29	Lotus XV	D. E. Jolly	1101 cc to 1500 cc	1	32
5	Bob Jane	27	Maserati 300S	New York Motors Pty. Ltd.	2001 cc to 3000 cc	2	31
6	Charlie Whatmore	28	Lotus XI Series 2 Coventry-Climax	C. Whatmore	1101 cc to 1500 cc	2	31
7	Don Swanton	71	Lotus XI Series 2	D. H. Swanton	Up to 1100cc	1	30
8	Ampt	49	Decca	D. E. Jolly	Up to 1100cc	2	30
9	Tom Sulman	58	Aston Martin DB3S	T. Sulman	2001 cc to 3000 cc	3	29
10	Frank Coad	64	Vauxhall Special	W. F. Coad	2001 cc to 3000 cc	4	29
11	Peter Manton	72	Austin-Healey Sprite Coventry-Climax	Monaro Motors	Up to 1100cc	3	29
12	John Roxburgh	62	Austin-Healey 100S	J. Roxburgh	2001 cc to 3000 cc	5	28
13	Eddie Perkins	78	Porsche	D. M. Calvert	1501 cc to 2000 cc	1	28
14	T. Valmor	77	Austin-Healey 100S	F. Agostino & Co. Pty. Ltd.	2001 cc to 3000 cc	6	27
15	Peter Candy	69	MG TF	P. M. Candy	1101 cc to 1500 cc	3	25
16	Rod Murphy	73	Austin-Healey Sprite	Esquire Motors	Up to 1100cc	4	25
DNF	Alan Jack	67	Cooper Coventry Climax	Brifield Motors	1101 cc to 1500 cc	-	25
DNF	Warren Blomfield	57	Aston Martin DB3S	W. F. Blomfield	2001 cc to 3000 cc	-	20
DNF	Jon Leighton	68	Lotus XI Ford	J. F. E. Leighton	Up to 1100cc	-	19
DNF	Lou Molina	63	Monza Holden Special	L. Molina	2001 cc to 3000 cc	-	18
DNF	Stan Jones	24	Aston Martin DB3S	Stan Jones Motors Pty. Ltd.	2001 cc to 3000 cc	-	14
DNF	Jim Goldfinch	61	Austin-Healey 100S	J. Goldfinch	2001 cc to 3000 cc	-	13

=== Notes ===
- Attendance: 40,000
- Entries: 27
- Start: Massed grid start
- Starters: 22
- Finishers: 16
- Winner's race time: 65 minutes 47.2 seconds
- Winner's average speed: 92.8 mph
- Fastest Lap: D Whiteford & R Phillips: 2:01.02 (average 93.8 mph)
