= 1955 Argus Trophy =

The 1955 Argus Trophy was a motor race staged at the Albert Park Circuit in Victoria, Australia on 27 March 1955. The race, which was open to Formula Libre Racing Cars, was contested over 32 laps, a distance of 100 miles. It was organised by the Light Car Club of Australia and sponsored by The Argus, a Melbourne newspaper.

== Results ==
Pos.	Driver	No.	Car	Entrant	Laps
1	Doug Whiteford	3	Talbot-Lago	D Whiteford	32
2	Stan Jones	6	Cooper Bristol	Superior Cars Pty Ltd	
3	Kevin Neal	7	Cooper Bristol	RH Hunt & Co Pty Ltd	
4	Julian Barrett	18	BWA s/c	JS Barrett	
5	Ted Gray	8	Tornado V8	L Abrahams	
6	R Phillips	24	Allard K2	RK Phillips	
7	L O'Donogue	30	Ballot Oldsmobile	LF O'Donogue	
8	Bill Miller	37	MG TC Special	CW Miller	
9	E Brotherton	27	Austin-Healey	CR Dickason	
10	L Molina	25	MM Holden	L Molina	
11	H Thompson	38	HRG	HE Tompson	
12	Reg Hunt	1	Maserati	RH Hunt & Co Pty Ltd	25
13	F Murphy	40	Singer Holden	F Murphy	
14	D Leonard	90	MG Vauxhall	DJ Leonard	
15	W Wright	43	Ford 10 Special	WM Wright	
16	Jim Gullan	22	MG K3 s/c	J Gullan	16
?	K Machin	17	MYF	KR Machin	
DNF	Alec Mildren	5	Cooper Bristol	AG Mildren	5

Notes:

- Number of starters: Unknown
- Number of finishers: Unknown
- Winner's race time: 69 minutes 37 seconds (86.6 mph)
- Fastest Lap: Reg Hunt, 2 minutes 4 seconds (90.5 mph)
