= 1956 Moomba TT =

Motor race for open and closed sports cars

The 1956 Moomba TT was a motor race for open and closed sports cars, staged at the Albert Park Circuit in Victoria, Australia on 11 March 1956. It was the second Moomba TT, with a similar race having been run at Albert Park in 1955. Contested over 150 miles, it was the feature race on the first day of a two-day race meeting which was conducted on the two Sundays of Melbourne's Moomba Festival. The meeting was organised by the Light Car Club of Australia for the Argus Moomba Motor Races Committee.

The race was won by Tony Gaze driving a HWM Jaguar.

== Results ==
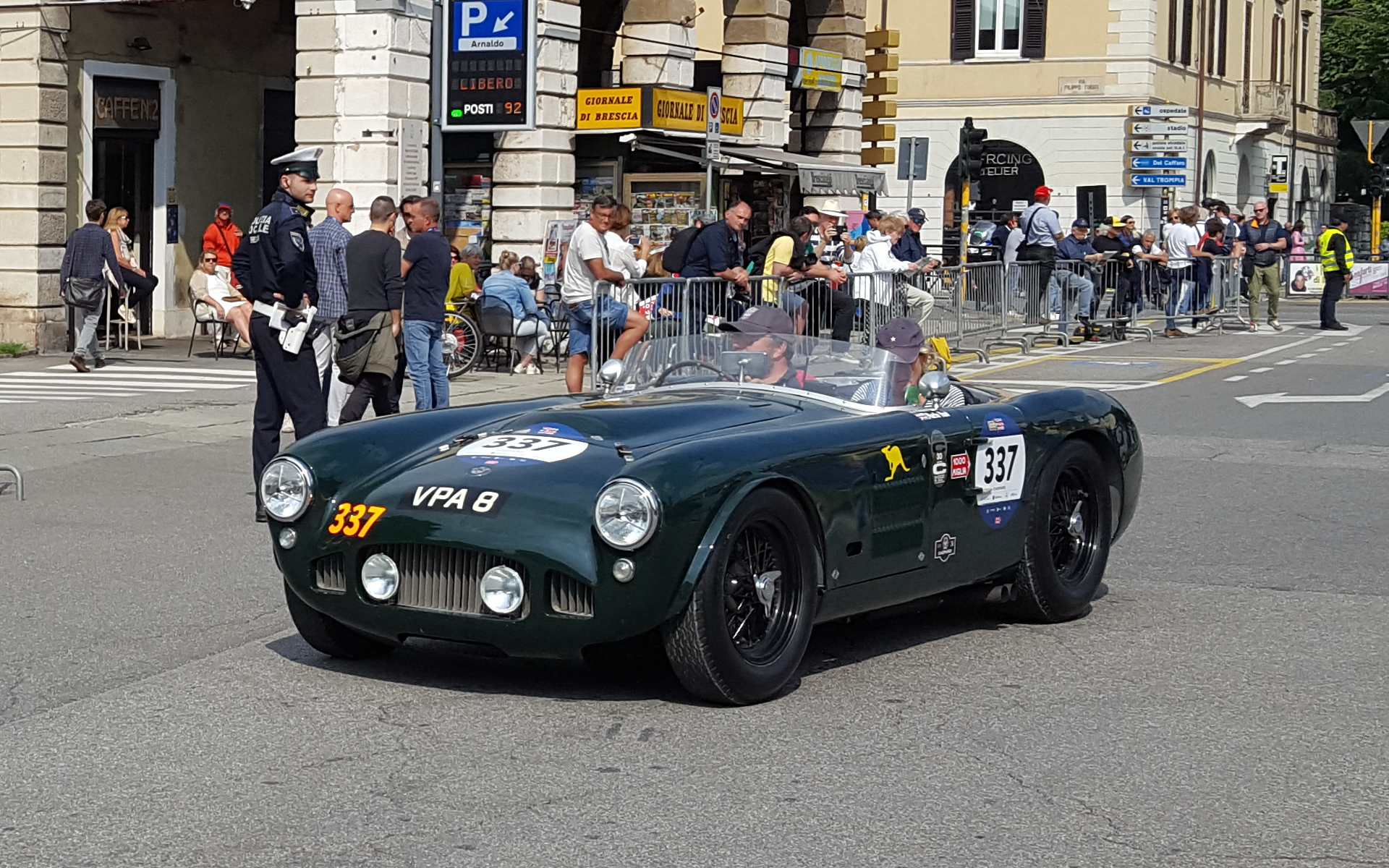
Tony Gaze won the race driving a HWM Jaguar similar to the example pictured

Position	Driver	No.	Car	Entrant	Class	Class pos.	Laps
1	Tony Gaze	40	HWM Jaguar	F.A.O. Gaze	Open	1	48
2	Bib Stillwell	44	Jaguar D-Type	B.S. Stillwell	Open	2	48
3	Ron Phillips	56	Austin-Healey 100S	J.K. & R.K. Phillips	2001-3000cc	1	47
4	Otto Stone	70	Porsche Spyder	N. McK. Hamilton	1101-1500cc	1	47
5	Doug Whiteford	69	Triumph TR2	D. Whiteford	1501-2000cc	1	46
6	C.W. Miller	55	Austin-Healey	C.W. Miller	2001-3000cc	2	44
7	Bill Patterson	73	MGA	Bill Patterson	1101-1500cc	2	44
8	Stuart Charge	51	Healey Special	S. & N. Charge	2001-3000cc	3	43
9	Paul England	62	Ausca Holden	P.T. England	2001-3000cc	4	43
10	Neil Charge	71	MGTC	S. & N. Charge	1101-1500cc	3	41
11	C. Porter	84	Austin-Healey	C. Porter	2001-3000cc	5	41
12	Les Murphy	74	Porsche 1500 Super	L. Murphy	1101-1500cc	4	41
13	M.R. Bottomley	79	MGTC s/c	M.R. Bottomley	1101-1500cc	5	38
14	C. Martyr	99	Sunbeam 3-litre	C. Martyr	Open	3	37
15	L. Marsh	54	Austin-Healey	L. Marsh	2001-3000cc	6	37
16	Alex Strachan	80	Lotus Mark VI Coventry Climax	A.W. Strachan	Up to 1100cc	1	37
17	G.A. Hay	67	Triumph TR2	G.A. Hay	1501-2000cc	2	34
18	J.R. Lanyon	78	MGTC special	J.R. Lanyon	1101-1500cc		36
19	R.G. Gibbs	52	Austin-Healey	R.G. Gibbs	2001-3000cc		35
20	Frank Porter	57	Austin-Healey	F.R. Porter	2001-3000cc		34
21	A. Maxwell	60	Aston Martin DB2	A. Maxwell	2001-3000cc		26
22	Alan Gray	46	Jaguar XK140	A.R. Gray	Open		26
23	J. Haimson	66	Triumph TR2	J. Haimson	1501-2000cc		25
24	Stan Jones	41	Cooper T33 Jaguar	S.J. Jones	Open		24
25	O. Bailey	61	Holden Special	O. Bailey	2001-3000cc		24
26	C. Oliver	43	Jaguar XK120 s/c	C. Oliver	Open		23
27	Bill Leech	64	MM Holden	W. Leech	2001-3000cc		17
28	Kevin Stuart	48	Austin-Healey	K.P. Stuart	2001-3000cc		16
29	Jeff Brotherton	50	Austin-Healey 100S	J. Brotherton	2001-3000cc		14
30	A.C. Newman	76	MGTF	A.C. Newman	1101-1500cc		14
31	G. Baillieu	65	Triumph TR2	G. Baillieu	1501-2000cc		12
32	E. Davey-Milne	88	Frazer Nash s/c	E. Davey-Milne	1101-1500cc		11
33	N.F. Lewin	53	Austin-Healey	N.F. Lewin	2001-3000cc		11
34	L.J. Taylor	59	Austin-Healey	L.J. Taylor	2001-3000cc		8
35	K. Hahn	82	Austin-Healey	Grosvenor Motor Auctions	2001-3000cc		4
36	W.F. Coad	63	Vauxhall Special	W.F. Coad	2001-3000cc		4
37	E. Pearce	75	Jowett Javelin Jupiter	E. Pearce	1101-1500cc		3

Notes

- Attendance: 100,000
- Start: Le Mans type
- Starters: 37
- Race time of winning car: 1:49:04 (83.5 mph)
- Fastest lap: Tony Gaze, Bib Stillwell & Stan Jones: 2:10 (86.5 mph)
