= John Crouch (racing driver) =

Australian racing driver (1918–2004)

- Born: 15 August 1918 Sydney, Australia
- Died: 30 May 2004 (aged 85) Gosford, Australia

John Crouch was a Australian racing driver who competed from the 1930s to 1954. He won the 1949 Australian Grand Prix.

Born in Sydney, he would enter multiple races, all of which were in Australia. He also operated a motor dealership in Sydney.

== Early life ==
John Crouch was born on 15 August 1918 in Sydney. He studied at the Sydney Church of England Grammar School.

When Crouch was 17, he bought a MG TA.

== Racing career ==
Crouch started his career at the 1938 Australian Grand Prix, where he finished 5th.

In the 1930s, Crouch was considered by many as Australia's youngest racing driver. In the 1939 Australian Grand Prix, he finished 7th. Following World War II, he returned to racing. In the 1948 Australian Grand Prix, he finished 8th, and won the 1949 Australian Grand Prix using a Delahaye 135CS. He continued racing in two more Australian races, the 1951 Australian Grand Prix, and the 1952 Australian Grand Prix, in which he retired in both. His final races were in 1953 and 1954 in the Redex Round Australia Trials, as well as the 24-Hour Race at Mount Druitt, before retiring from racing.
