= 1956 Argus Trophy =

The 1956 Argus Trophy was a Formula Libre motor race held at the Albert Park Circuit in Victoria, Australia on 18 March 1956. The race was contested over 48 laps, a total distance of 150 miles. It was staged by the Light Car Club of Australia as the feature event on the second Sunday of the two-day "Moomba Meeting", which was held with the co-operation of the Moomba Festival organisers.

The race was won by Reg Hunt driving a Maserati 250F.

== Results ==
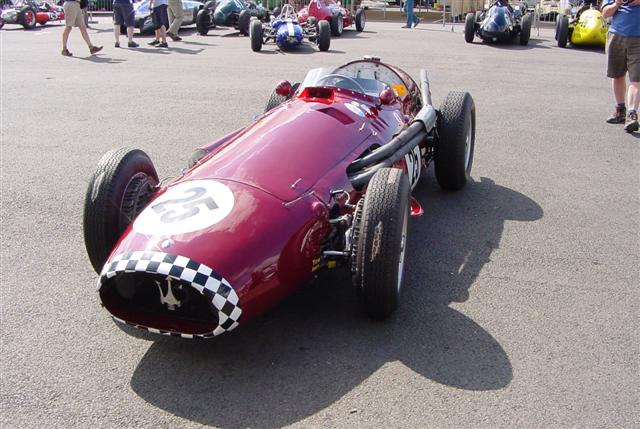
A Maserati 250F, similar to the car driven to victory in the 1956 Argus Trophy by Reg Hunt

Position	Driver	No.	Car	Entrant	Laps
1	Reg Hunt	2	Maserati 250F	R. H. Hunt & Co. Pty. Ltd.	48
2	Lex Davison	4	Ferrari Type 500	Ecurie Australie	48
3	Kevin Neal	3	Maserati A6GCM	R. H. Hunt & Co. Pty. Ltd.	47
4	Tom Hawkes	7	Cooper Type 23 Repco Holden	T. V. Hawkes	45
5	Bib Stillwell	44	Jaguar D-Type	B. S. Stillwell	45
6	Arthur Griffiths	5	HWM Jaguar		45
7	Ken Wylie	26	Cooper Mark V Norton	K. Wylie	39
8	E. Milthorpe	16	Ford V8 Special	E. C. Milthorpe	39
9	Alex Strachan	80	Lotus Mark VI Coventry Climax	A. W. Strachan	38
10	H. Thompson	28	HRG	H. Thompson	37
11	Jock Cummins	19	Bugatti Type 37A Holden	J. K. Cummins	37
12	Harry McLaughlin	14	Ford V8 Special		29
13	Julian Barrett	10	BWA s/c	J. S. Barrett	28
14	Bruce Walton & Ted Gray	12	Tornado	L. J. Abrahams & L. W. Gray	25
15	Reg Smith	8	Cooper Type 40 Bristol	R. Smith	24
16	Bill Craig	11	Alta Holden	W. J. Craig	21
17	K. McConville	17	Austin Special	K. H. McConville	21
18	Bill Wilcox	9	Alta s/c		18
19	G. Nankervis	24	NR MG s/c	G. Nankervis	13
20	E. Perkins	25	Volkswagen Special s/c	E. B. Perkins	5
21	Noel Wade	23	Austin A40 Special s/c	N. Wade	2
22	E. Clay	21	HRG	E. A. Clay	0

- Starters: 22
- Winner's race time: 1:28:32
- Fastest lap: Reg Hunt, Maserati 250F, 1:59, 94.5 mph
- Attendance: 70,000
