= 1951 Australian Grand Prix =

- Formula Libre race

Race details
- Date: 5 March 1951
- Location: Narrogin, Western Australia
- Course: Temporary street circuit
- Course length: 7.08 km (4.4 miles)
- Distance: 24 laps, 169.9 km (105.6 miles)
- Weather: Sunny

Fastest lap
Driver	(Australia) John Crouch	Cooper-JAP
- Time: 3'51

Podium
First	(Australia) Warwick Pratley	Reed-Ford
Second	(Australia) Dick Bland	Delahaye
Third	(Australia) Steve Tillett	MG

The 1951 Australian Grand Prix was a Formula Libre motor race held at a street circuit in Narrogin, Western Australia on 5 March 1951. The race was held over 24 laps of the 7.1-kilometre (4.4 mi) circuit for a race distance of 170 kilometres (110 mi).

It was the sixteenth Australian Grand Prix and the last to feature a handicap start which saw the slower cars starting ahead of the faster cars according to handicap allowance. The first car over the line was the MG TC special of South Australian Steve Tillett. The Australian Grand Prix title was however to be awarded to the driver setting the fastest outright time, regardless of handicap. The title was won by Warwick Pratley driving a George Reed built Flathead Ford V8 powered racing car. It would be the last Australian Grand Prix victory by an Australian built car until Frank Matich won the 1971 race at the wheel of a Matich A50. Pratley started the race ten minutes and thirty seconds behind the first car to start the race, the Morgan of Colin Uphill. Pratley won the race by 96 seconds over the Delahaye of Dick Bland. Both Tillett and Pratley were awarded Commonwealth Jubilee Trophies for their victories in what was effectively two races in one.

== Classification ==
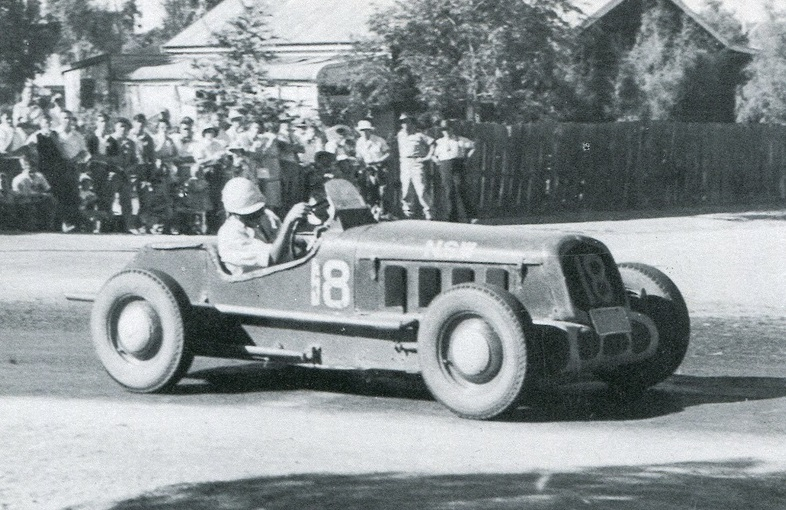
Race winner Warwick Pratley shown contesting the 1951 Australian Grand Prix in the Ford V8 powered G. Reed Special

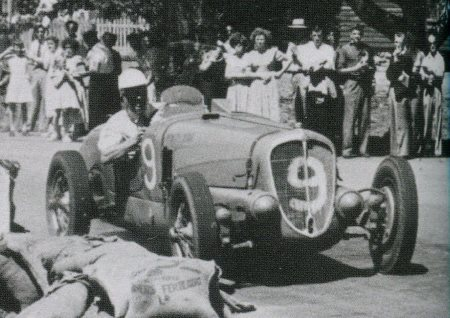
Dick Bland (Delahaye Type 135) recorded the second fastest race time.

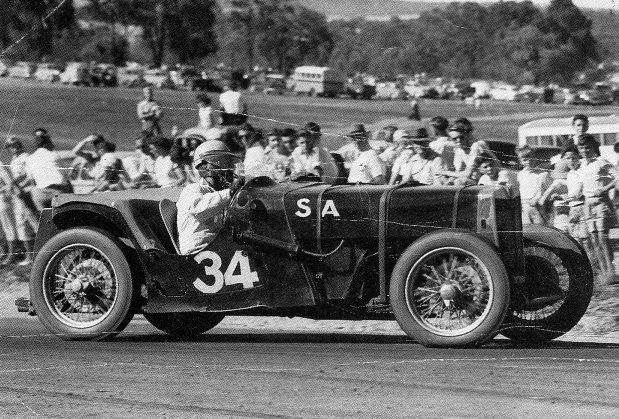
Steve Tillett recorded third fastest time and won the handicap award driving an MG TC

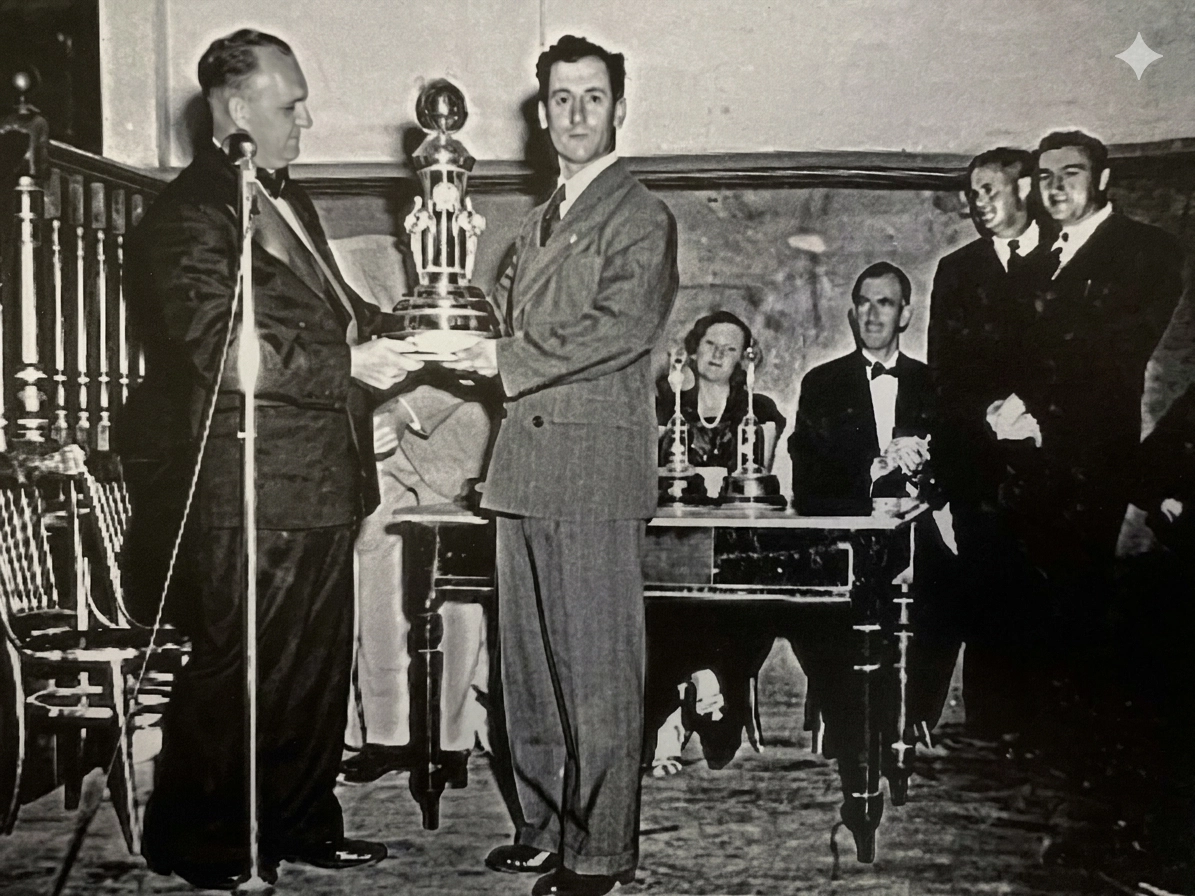
Steve Tillett receiving the trophy for winning the handicap section of the 1951 Australian Grand Prix

Results as follows.

Pos	No.	Driver	Car	Laps	Time	H'cap Pos
1	18	(Australia) Warwick Pratley	George Reed Special / Ford 4.0L	24	1h 39m 15s	3
2	9	(Australia) Dick Bland	Delahaye 135 / Delahaye 3.6L	24	1h 40m 41s	8
3	34	(Australia) Steve Tillett	MG TC / MG 1.3L	24	1h 43m 30s	1
4	15	(Australia) Barry Ranford	Chrysler 6 Special / Chrysler 2.9L	24	1h 47m 03s	7
5	37	(Australia) Bill Hayes	MG TC / MG 1.3L	24	1h 47m 36s	2
6	33	(Australia) Sid Taylor	TS Dodge Special / Dodge 3.6L	24	1h 49m 18s	5
7	41	(Australia) Ron Kennedy	MG TC / MG 1.3L	24	1h 50m 21s	4
8	30	(Australia) Peter McKenna	BMW 328 / BMW 2.0L	24	1h 51m 05s	9
9	44	(Australia) Colin Uphill	Morgan 4/4 / Coventry Climax 1.2L	24	1h 55m 48s	6
10	17	(Australia) Syd Negus	Plymouth 6 Special / Plymouth 3.3L	24	2h 03m 6s	10
Ret	32	(Australia) Jack Nelson	Ford 10 Special / Ford s/c 1.2L	23		
Ret	16	(Australia) George Reed	George Reed Monoskate / Ford 4.0L	22		
Ret	1	(United Kingdom) Colin Murray	Maserati 6C / Maserati 1.5L	19		
Ret	19	(Australia) Harold Smith	Smith Special /	14		
Ret	12	(Australia) Vin Maloney	MG TC / MG 1.3L	11		
Ret	24	(Australia) Ron Denney	Targa Florio Ballot / Ford 3.6L	9		
Ret	10	(Australia) Eldred Norman	Double Ford V8 Special / Ford 7.8L	7		
Ret		(Australia) Andy Brown	MG TC / MG s/c 1.3L	6		
Ret	26	(Australia) Des Page	Ranford Chrysler 6 Special / Chrysler	5		
Ret	7	(Australia) Keith Martin	Cooper Mk.IV / JAP 1.0L	5		
Ret	25	(Australia) Bob Brown	Alfa Romeo 6C 1750 / Ford 4.0L	3		
Ret	4	(Australia) John Crouch	Cooper Mk.V / JAP 1.1L	3		
Ret	38	(Australia) Noel Aldous	MG TC / MG 1.3L	2		
Ret	42	(Australia) Claude LaMotte	Fidget Fiat 500 / Ford 1.2L	2		
Ret	27	(Australia) John Cummins	Ballot / Oldsmobile 3.9L	2		
Ret	40	(Australia) A. Dry	MG TC / MG 1.3L	1		
Ret	36	(Australia) Bob Brown	MG TC / MG 1.3L	1		
Ret	20	(Australia) Dennis Curran	Ford V8 Special / Ford 4.0L	1		

== Notes ==
- Fastest lap: John Crouch (Cooper Mk.IV JAP 1100), 3:51s, 68.57 mph, 110.33 km/h

Preceded by 1950 Australian Grand Prix	Australian Grand Prix; 1951	Succeeded by 1952 Australian Grand Prix
