= 1950 Australian Grand Prix =

- Formula Libre race

Race details
- Date: 2 January 1950
- Location: Nuriootpa, South Australia
- Course: Temporary road circuit
- Course length: 4.8 km (3.0 miles)
- Distance: 34 laps, 163.2 km (102 miles)
- Weather: Sunny

Fastest lap
Driver	(Australia) Rupert Steele (Australia) Doug Whiteford	Alfa Romeo; Ford
- Time: 2'27

Podium
First	(Australia) Doug Whiteford	Ford
Second	(Australia) Rupert Steele	Alfa Romeo
Third	(Australia) Jim Gullan	Ballot-Oldsmobile

The 1950 Australian Grand Prix was a motor race held at the Nuriootpa Road Circuit in South Australia on 2 January 1950. It was organised by the Sporting Car Club of South Australia, promoted by the Barossa Valley Vintage Festival Association and staged over 34 laps of the 4.8-kilometre circuit for a race distance of 163 kilometres. The race, which is recognized by the Confederation of Australian Motor Sport as the fifteenth Australian Grand Prix, was a Formula Libre race.

The race utilised a handicap start with cars commencing progressively, slowest through to fastest, at timed intervals. The declared winner of the Grand Prix however, was the driver with the fastest elapsed race time, regardless of handicap. All other official awards were based on the handicap results, with an additional trophy awarded to the handicap winner and prize money paid for the first nine handicap places. Doug Whiteford, driving a Ford V8 Special, known as 'Black Bess', won his first Australian Grand Prix, completing the race distance almost three minutes faster than Rupert Steele, driving an Alfa Romeo. Jim Gullan, driving an Oldsmobile-powered Ballot Special recorded the third fastest race time and was also the official handicap winner.

== Classification ==
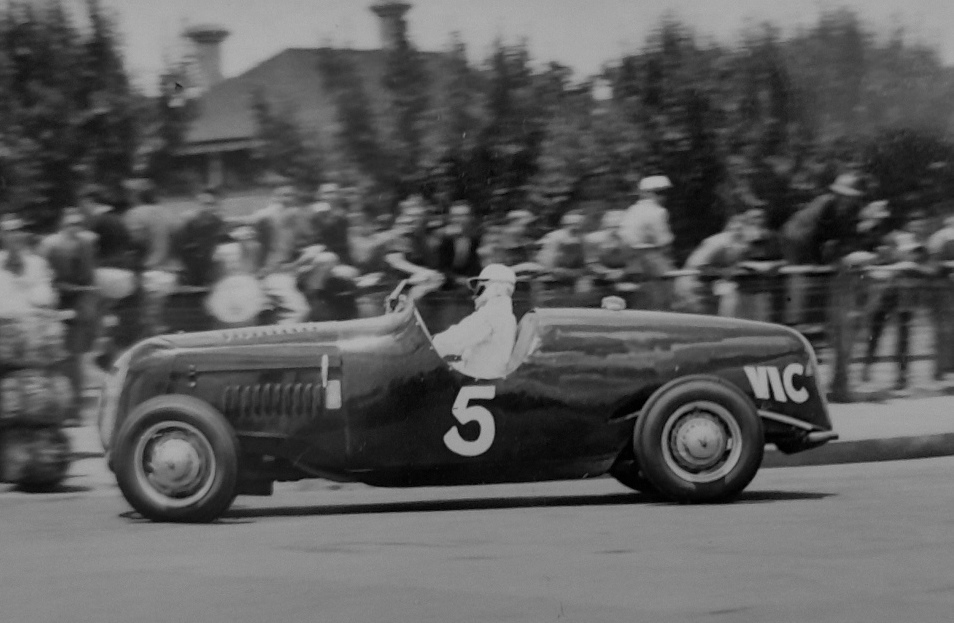
Doug Whiteford won the 1950 Australian Grand Prix title driving a Ford V8 Special.

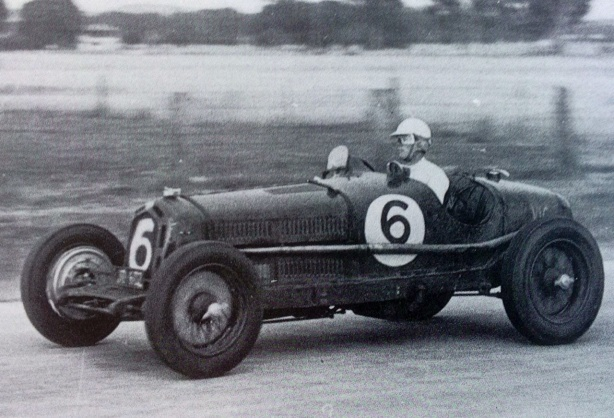
Rupert Steele set the second fastest time and placed ninth on handicap driving an Alfa Romeo Monza

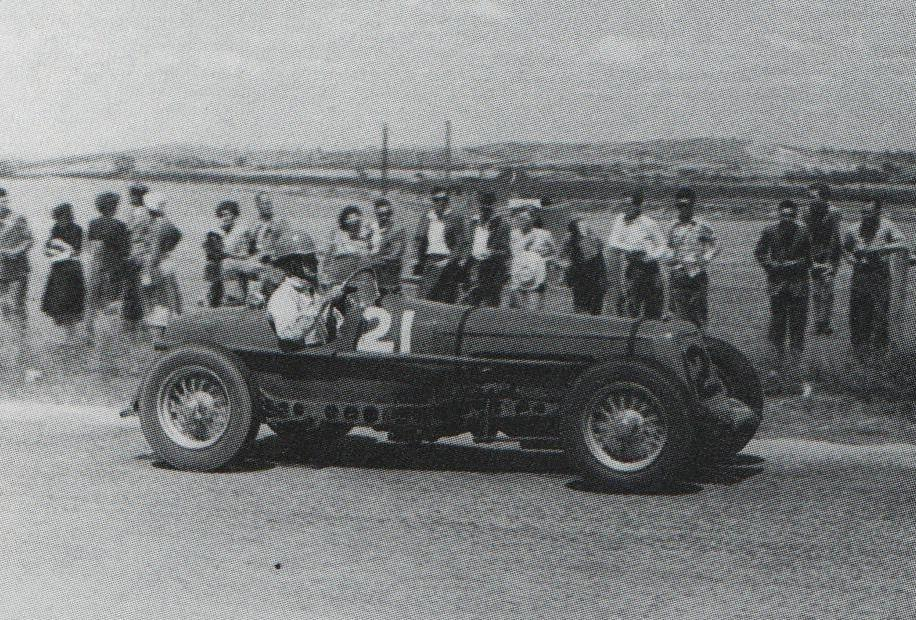
Jim Gullan set the third fastest time and won the handicap award driving a Ballot Special.

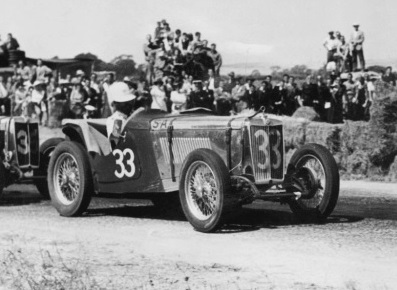
The MG TC of Ron Kennedy recorded seventh fastest time and placed third on handicap.

Pos	No.	Driver	Car / Engine	Entrant	Laps	Time	H'cap Pos	H'cap start
1	5	(Australia) Doug Whiteford	Ford V8 Special / Ford 4.2L	D Whiteford	34	1h 24m 53s	5	1m 45s
2	6	(Australia) Rupert Steele	Alfa Romeo 8C / Alfa Romeo 2.3L	PJR Steele	34	1h 27m 51s	9	1m 45s
3	21	(Australia) Jim Gullan	Ballot Special / Oldsmobile 3.9L	J Gullan	34	1h 29m 23s	1	7m 45s
4	30	(Australia) David Harvey	MG TC Special / MG 1.3L	DG Harvey	34	1h 33m 49s	2	11m 00s
5	22	(Australia) Bill Willcox	Dodge Special / Dodge 4.1L	WH Wilcox	34	1h 34m 11s	10	8m 20s
6	32	(Australia) Steve Tillett	MG TC Special / MG 1.3L	SD Tillett	34	1h 34m 37s	6	11m 50s
7	33	(Australia) Ron Kennedy	MG TC / MG 1.3L	RJ Kennedy	34	1h 34m 41s	3	11m 30s
8	35	(Australia) Don Cant	MG TC / MG 1.3L	DP Cant	34	1h 35m 05s	4	11m 55s
9	27	(Australia) Howard Keil	HRG Special / HRG 1.5L	FAO Gaze	34	1h 35m 57s	8	9m 40s
10	26	(Australia) Norman Steele	HRG Special / HRG 1.5L	NC Steele	34	1h 36m 08s	7	9m 40s
11	19	(Australia) Granton Harrison	Phillips V8 Special / Ford 3.9L	GT Harrison	34	1h 37m 39s	11	7m 45s
12	29	(Australia) Vin Maloney	MG TC Special / MG 1.3L	VA Maloney	34	1h 40m 14s	12	10m 40s
13	38	(Australia) Ross Vinall	MG NA / MG 1.3L	RK Vinall	34	1h 46m 42s	13	13m 00s
Ret	25	(Australia) Peter McKenna	BMW 328 / BMW 2.0L	Peter McKenna	33			9m 05s
Ret	34	(Australia) D. Douglas	MG TC / MG 1.3L	AP Douglas	32			11m 55s
Ret	20	(Australia) Dennis Curran	Curran Ford V8 Special / Ford 4.0L	DE Curran	30			7m 45s
Ret	16	(Australia) Ken Tubman	MG K3 / MG s/c 1.1L	KV Tubman	28			4m 50s
Ret	31	(Australia) Ian Jackson	MG TC / MG 1.3L	IN Jackson	25			11m 20s
Ret	40	(Australia) Phil Harrison	MG P / Vauxhall 1.4L	P Harrison	21			13m 00s
Ret	24	(Australia) Bob Brown	Alfa Romeo 6C 1750 / Ford 4.0L	RS Brown	21			9m 00s
Ret	3	(Australia) Charlie Dean	Maybach Special Mk.1 / Maybach 4.2L	HC Dean	21			0m 30s
Ret	23	(Australia) L. Robinson	Bugatti / Dodge	LD Robinson	15			8m 40s
Ret	11	(Australia) Peter Damman	Hudson Special / Hudson	P Denman	13			2m 50s
Ret	36	(Australia) E. Truman	MG TC / MG 1.3L	EC Truman	11			11m 55s
Ret	17	(Australia) Bill Patterson	MG TC / MG s/c 1.3L	GW Patterson	6			5m 05s
Ret	39	(Australia) Max Galt	MG NA / MG 1.3L	M Galt	4			13m 00s
Ret	4	(Australia) Eldred Norman	Double Ford V8 Special / Ford 7.8L	E de B Norman	2			1m 25s
Ret	15	(Australia) Otto Stone	MG K3 / MG s/c 1.1L	Otto Stone	1			4m 50s
Ret	2	(Australia) Lex Davison	Alfa Romeo Tipo B / Alfa Romeo 3.0L	AN Davison	1			0m 30s
DNS	1	(Australia) Tony Gaze	Alta	FAO Gaze	-			0m 00s
DNS	12	(Australia) Stan Jones	HRG	S Jones	-			3m 25s
DNS	14	(Australia) John Barraclough	MG K3 s/c	A.N. Davison	-			4m 50s

The above results rank all finishers based on actual race time, regardless of handicap. Officially, race results were based on handicap placings, with the exception of the actual Australian Grand Prix title itself, which was awarded to the driver setting the fastest race time.

It is not known if the cars of McKenna and Douglas actually retired from the race or were still running when the race time expired.

== Notes ==
- Attendance: 35,000 (police estimate)
- Number of starters: 29
- Fastest lap: Rupert Steele and Doug Whiteford – 2'27 (73.47 mph, 118.2 km/h)

Preceded by 1949 Australian Grand Prix	Australian Grand Prix; 1950	Succeeded by 1951 Australian Grand Prix
