= 1953 Australian Grand Prix =

- Formula Libre race

Race details
- Date: 21 November 1953
- Location: Albert Park, Melbourne, Victoria
- Course: Temporary street circuit
- Course length: 5.03 km (3.125 miles)
- Distance: 64 laps, 321.92 km (250 miles)
- Weather: Sunny

Fastest lap
| Driver | (Australia) Stan Jones | Maybach Special |
- Time: 2'03

Podium
| First | (Australia) Doug Whiteford | Talbot-Lago |
| Second | (Australia) Curley Brydon | MG Special |
| Third | (Australia) Andy Brown | MG |

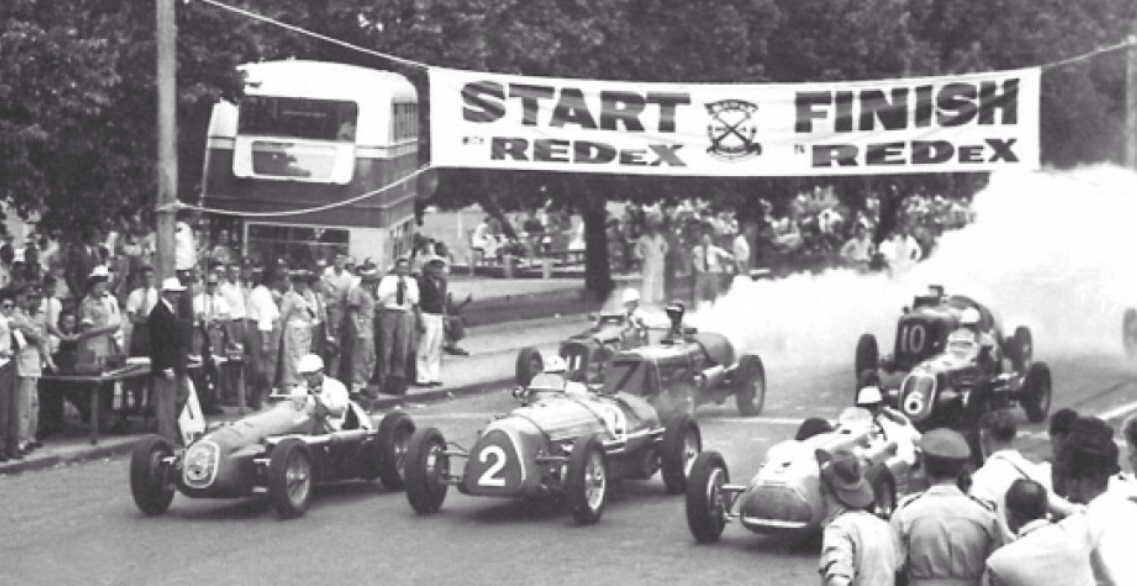
The start of the 1953 Australian Grand Prix. Davison (#3 HWM), Jones (#2 Maybach) and Whiteford (#1 Talbot-Lago)

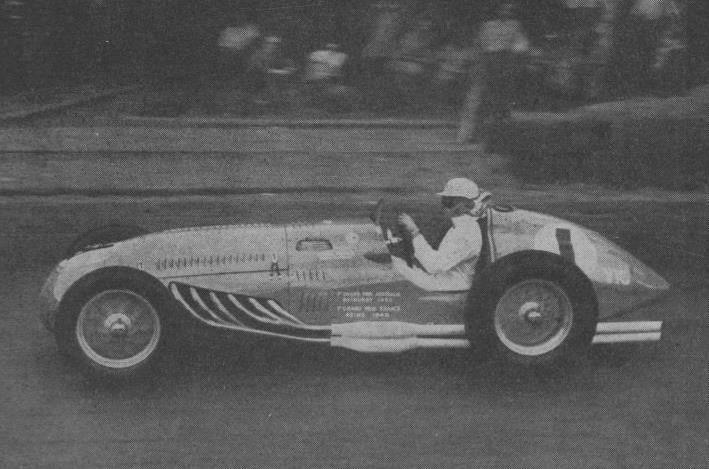
Race winner Doug Whiteford (Talbot-Lago T26C) contesting the 1953 Australian Grand Prix

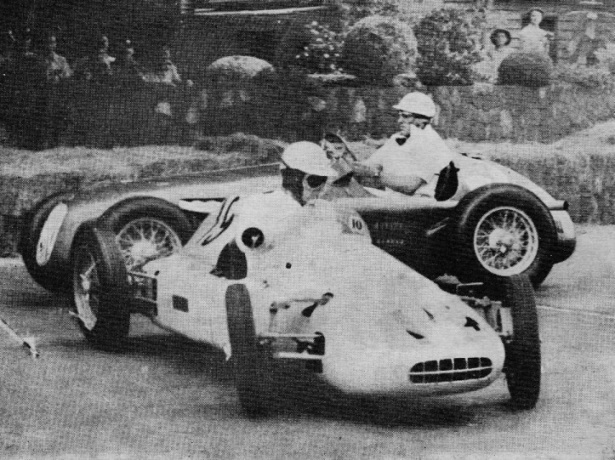
The 9th placed Wylie Javelin of Ken & Arthur Wylie, pictured during its first lap spin with Arthur driving

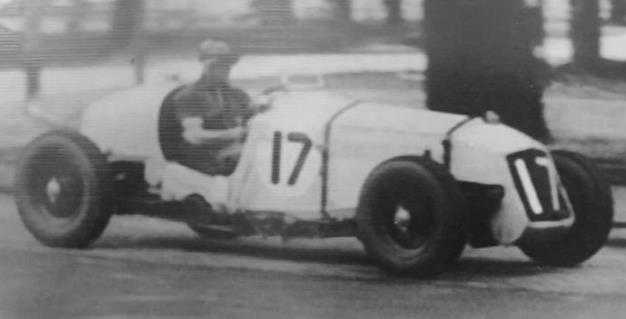
Alf Barrett and Julian Barrett placed 12th driving the BWA

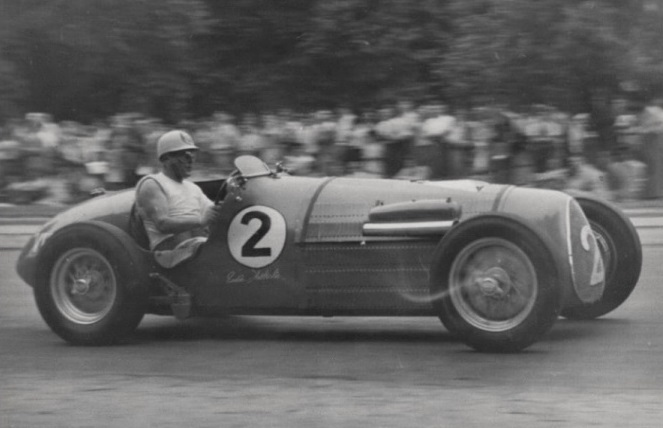
Stan Jones (Maybach Special) set fastest lap of the race but did not finish

The 1953 Australian Grand Prix was a Formula Libre motor race held at Albert Park Street Circuit, Victoria, Australia on 21 November 1953. The race, which had 40 starters, was held over 64 laps of the five kilometre circuit for a total of 322 kilometres. It was organised by the Light Car Club of Australia and Army Southern Command.

It was the eighteenth Australian Grand Prix. While much of the Grand Prix's history to this point had taken place on public road or street circuits, this was the first time it had been held on a circuit in a major population centre. The circuit was laid out on public roads surrounding the Albert Park Lake in inner Melbourne.

The race was won by Doug Whiteford, his third and final Australian Grand Prix victory, equalling the feat achieved by Bill Thompson in the 1930s. It was also the largest margin of victory in the race's history, Whiteford winning by six laps for a margin of 30 kilometres.

== Classification ==
Results as follows.

| Pos | No. | Driver | Car / Engine | Entrant | Laps | Time |
|---|---|---|---|---|---|---|
| 1 | 1 | (Australia) Doug Whiteford | Talbot-Lago T26C / Talbot-Lago 4.5L | D. Whiteford | 64 | 2h 24m 50s |
| 2 | 26 | (Australia) Curley Brydon | MG TC Special / MG s/c 1.3L | H. Brydon | 58 | |
| 3 | 22 | (Australia) Andy Brown | MG K3 / MG 1.1L | A.G. Brown | 57 | |
| 4 | 23 | (Australia) Les Murphy | MG Q / MG 0.7L | L.P. Murphy | 57 | |
| 5 | 30 | (Australia) Lou Molina | MM Special / Holden 2.3L | L. Molina | 56 | |
| 6 | 32 | (Australia) Jim Leach | Austin-Healey 100 / Austin-Healey 2.7L | C.R. Dickason | 56 | |
| 7 | 7 | (Australia) Frank Kleinig | Kleinig-Hudson 8 Special / Hudson 4.4L | F. Kleinig | 56 | |
| 8 | 38 | (Australia) Stuart Charge | Austin-Healey 100 / Austin-Healey 2.7L | L.J. Gray | 55 | |
| 9 | 19 | (Australia) Ken Wylie (Australia) Arthur Wylie | Wylie Javelin / Jowett s/c 1.5L | A.J. Wylie | 55 | |
| 10 | 16 | (Australia) Reg Hunt | Allard J2 / Cadillac 4.4L | R.H. Hunt | 55 | |
| 11 | 33 | (Australia) Bib Stillwell | Austin-Healey 100 / Austin-Healey 2.7L | B.S. Stillwell | 54 | |
| 12 | 17 | (Australia) Alf Barrett (Australia) Julian Barrett | BWA Special / Frazer Nash 1.5L | J. Barrett | 53 | |
| 13 | 40 | (Australia) Neil Charge | MG TC Special / MG 1.3L | N. and S. Charge | 52 | |
| 14 | 35 | (Australia) Frank Lobb | Jaguar XK120 / Jaguar 3.4L | F. Lobb | 51 | |
| 15 | 9 | (Australia) Ted McKinnon | Maserati 6C / Maserati 1.5L | E.D. McKinnon | 50 | |
| 16 | 42 | (Australia) John Nind | MG TB Special / MG 1.3L | J.P. Nind | 45 | |
| 17 | 60 | (Australia) Bill Patterson | Cooper Mk.V / JAP 0.5L | Ecurie Australie | 43 | |
| 18 | 31 | (Australia) Syd Negus | Plymouth Special / Plymouth 3.1L | S.A. Negus | 39 | |
| Ret | 2 | (Australia) Stan Jones | Maybach Special Mk.1 / Maybach 4.3L | Ecurie Australie | 58 | |
| Ret | 34 | (Australia) John Calvert | Jaguar XK120 / Jaguar 3.4L | J. Calvert | 52 | |
| Ret | 28 | (Australia) Les O'Donaghue | Ballot / Oldsmobile 3.9L | L.F. O'Donoghue | 48 | |
| Ret | 6 | (Australia) Peter Vennermark (Australia) Cec Warren | Maserati 4CL / Maserati 1.5L | C. Warren | 41 | |
| Ret | 65 | (Australia) Harry Thompson (Australia) Wal Gillespie | HRG Special | H. Thompson | 39 | |
| Ret | 15 | (Australia) Bill Wilcox | Ford V8 Special / Ford 4.3L | W. Wilcox | 37 | |
| Ret | 55 | (Australia) Ron Phillips | Allard K2 / Ford 4.4L | J.H. Phillips | 34 | |
| Ret | 57 | (Australia) Haig Hurst | Allard K2 / Ford 4.4L | H.W. Hurst | 29 | |
| Ret | 25 | (Australia) Phillip Catlin | Bugatti T51A / Bugatti 1.5L | P.C. Catlin | 23 | |
| Ret | 27 | (Australia) Phil Harrison | Dodge Special / Dodge 4.0L | P.G. Harrison | 22 | |
| Ret | 64 | (Australia) Silvio Masolla | HRG Special / HRG 1.5L | S. Massola | 19 | |
| Ret | 10 | (Australia) W.H. Hayes | Ford V8 Special / Ford 4.4L | W.H. Hayes | 17 | |
| Ret | 11 | (Australia) Ted Gray | Alta / Ford 4.3L | E. Gray | 13 | |
| Ret | 18 | (Australia) Don McDonald | Austin A40 Special / Austin 1.3L | Weir and Male Motors | 13 | |
| Ret | 24 | (Australia) Reg Nutt | Talbot-Darracq / Talbot 1.5L | R.J. Nutt | 11 | |
| Ret | 37 | (Australia) Peter McKenna | BMW 328 / BMW 2.0L | P. McKenna | 11 | |
| Ret | 39 | (Australia) Jack O'Dea | MG Special / MG 1.3L | J.H. O'Dea | 8 | |
| Ret | 45 | (Australia) Gordon Greig | Cooper Mk.IV / JAP | G. Greig | 8 | |
| Ret | 56 | (Australia) Vin Maloney | MG TC Special / MG 1.3L | V. Moloney | 5 | |
| Ret | 20 | (Australia) Jim Gullan | MG K3 / MG 1.1L | J. Gullan | 3 | |
| Ret | 12 | (Australia) Arthur Chick | Bugatti T37 / Bugatti 2.0L | A.E. Chick | 3 | |
| Ret | 3 | (Australia) Lex Davison | HWM F2 / Jaguar 3.4L | Ecurie Australie | 1 | |
| DNS | 5 | (Australia) Jack Brabham | Cooper / Bristol 2.0L | J.A. Brabham | - | |

== Notes ==
- Winner's average speed: 82.85 mph
- Fastest lap: Stan Jones – 2'03

| Preceded by 1952 Australian Grand Prix | Australian Grand Prix; 1953 | Succeeded by 1954 Australian Grand Prix |
