= Doug Whiteford =

- Nationality: (Australia) Australian
- Born: Douglas Seymour Whiteford; 1914
- Died: 15 January 1979 (aged 64)

Australian Drivers' Championship
- Years active: 1957–1960

Douglas Seymour Whiteford (1914 – 15 January 1979) was an Australian racing driver.

Whiteford raced from the mid-1930s through to 1975 with a short period of inactivity during the 1960s. He was best known as a competitor in the Australian Grand Prix which he won three times in four years. He raced a Talbot-Lago T26 Formula One car which he used to win his second and third Grands Prix. His third win was at the first Albert Park street circuit which today hosts the modern Australian Grand Prix. Whiteford first contested the Australian Grand Prix in 1948 and continued to compete in the race regularly up to 1961 with a final appearance in the 1964 event. Whiteford also raced touring cars well into the 1970s. As a regular member of the Datsun Racing Team he was a fixture in small capacity Datsuns, usually as partner to John Roxburgh.

Whiteford died on 15 January 1979.

== Career results ==
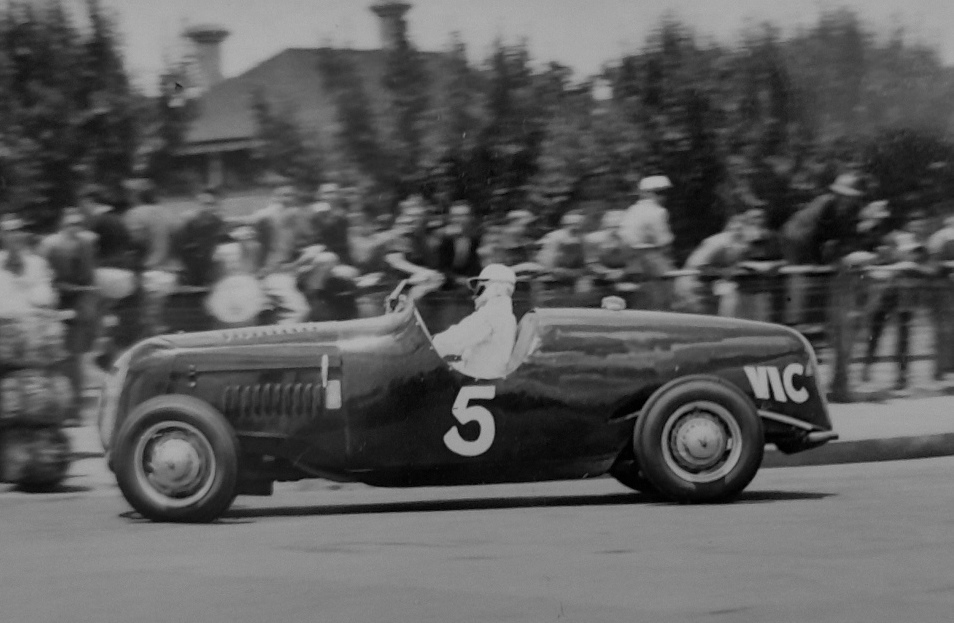
Whiteford won the 1950 Australian Grand Prix driving a Ford V8 Special

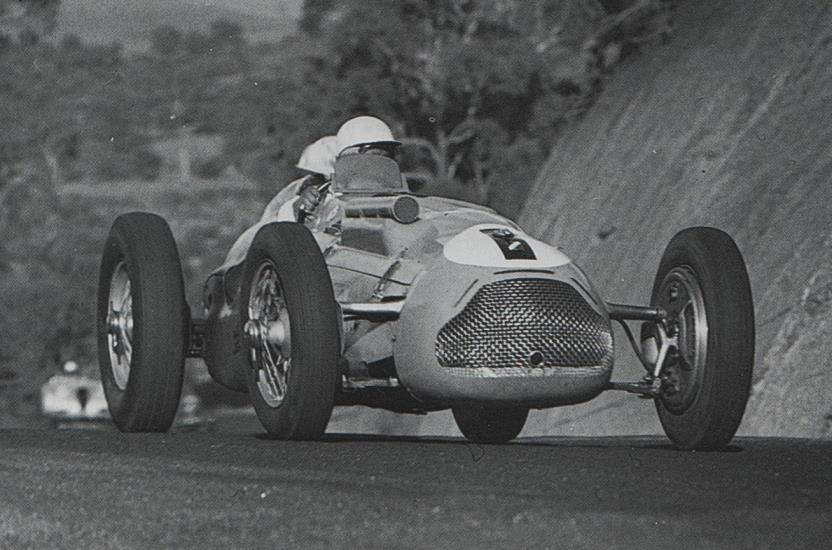
Whiteford won the 1952 Australian Grand Prix driving a Talbot-Lago T26C

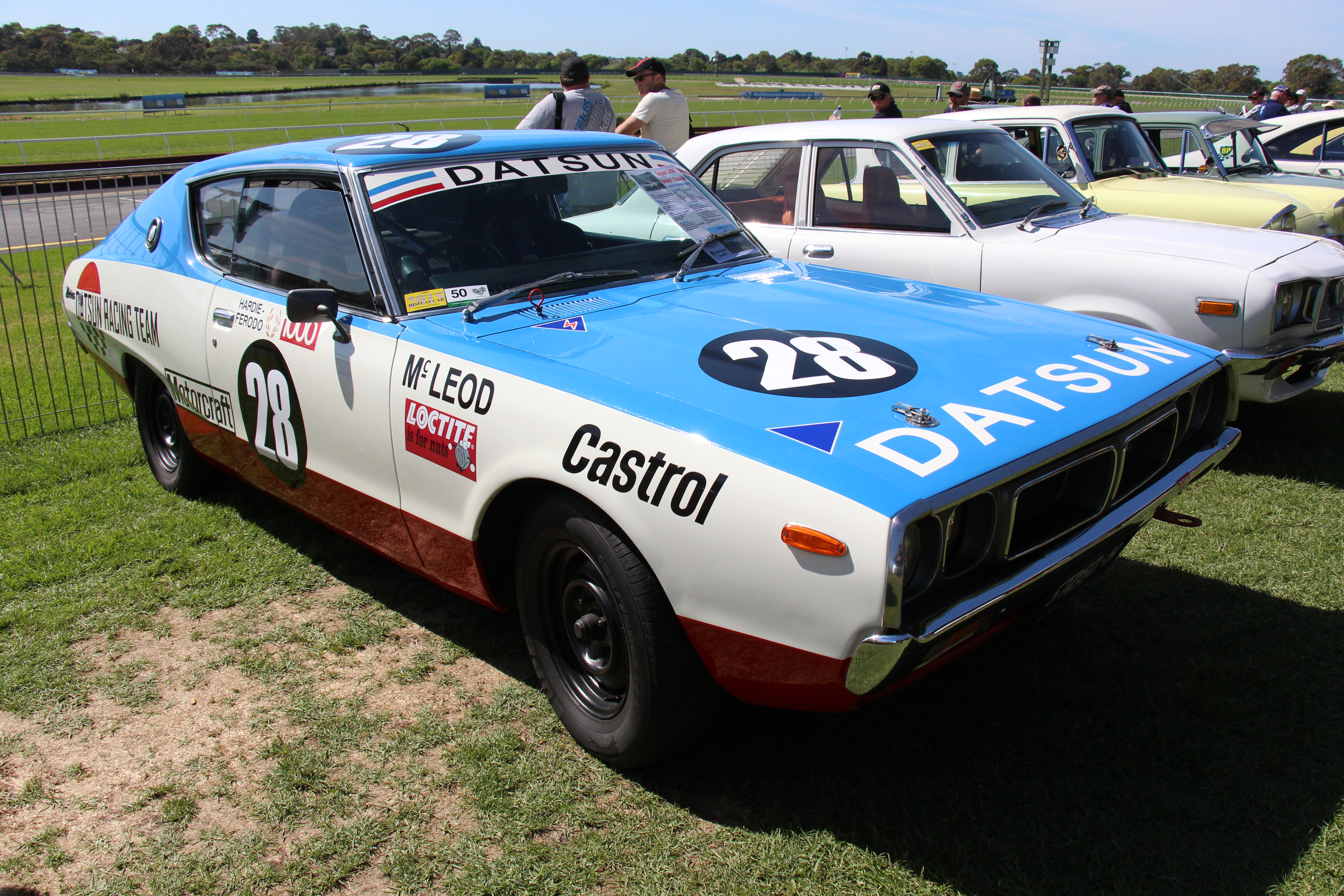
Whiteford drove this Datsun 240K in the 1974 Hardie-Ferodo 1000, placing seventh. The car is pictured in 2015.

Season	Series / race	Position	Car	Entrant
1950	Australian Grand Prix	1st	Ford V8 Special	D. Whiteford
1950	New South Wales 100	1st	Ford V8 Special	
1951	Redex 50 Mile Championship	1st	Talbot-Lago T26C	
1952	Australian Grand Prix	1st	Talbot-Lago T26C	
1953	Australian Grand Prix	1st	Talbot-Lago T26C	
1955	Argus Trophy	1st	Talbot-Lago	
1955	Moomba TT	1st	Triumph TR2	
1956	Moomba TT	5th	Triumph TR2	
1957	Australian Drivers' Championship	11th	Maserati 300S	
1957	Victorian Tourist Trophy	1st	Maserati 300S	D Whiteford
1958	Australian Drivers' Championship	5th	Maserati 300S	
1958	Victorian Tourist Trophy	1st	Maserati 300S	D Whiteford
1959	Australian Drivers' Championship	6th	Maserati 300S	
1960	Australian Drivers' Championship	13th	Cooper T51 Climax	
1960	Australian Tourist Trophy	2nd	Maserati 300S	

Sporting positions
Preceded by John Crouch	Winner of the Australian Grand Prix; 1950	Succeeded by Warwick Pratley
Preceded by Warwick Pratley	Winner of the Australian Grand Prix; 1952 & 1953	Succeeded by Lex Davison
