= 1952 Australian Grand Prix =

- Formula Libre race

Race details
- Date: 14 April 1952
- Location: Mount Panorama Circuit, Bathurst, New South Wales
- Course: Temporary road circuit
- Course length: 6.12 km (3.84 miles)
- Distance: 38 laps, 234.8 km (145.92 miles)
- Weather: Sunny

Pole position
Driver	(Australia) Doug Whiteford	Talbot-Lago

Fastest lap
Driver	(Australia) Doug Whiteford	Talbot-Lago
- Time: 3'02

Podium
First	(Australia) Doug Whiteford	Talbot-Lago
Second	(Australia) Stan Jones	Maybach Special
Third	(Australia) Bill Murray	Alfa Romeo-Alvis

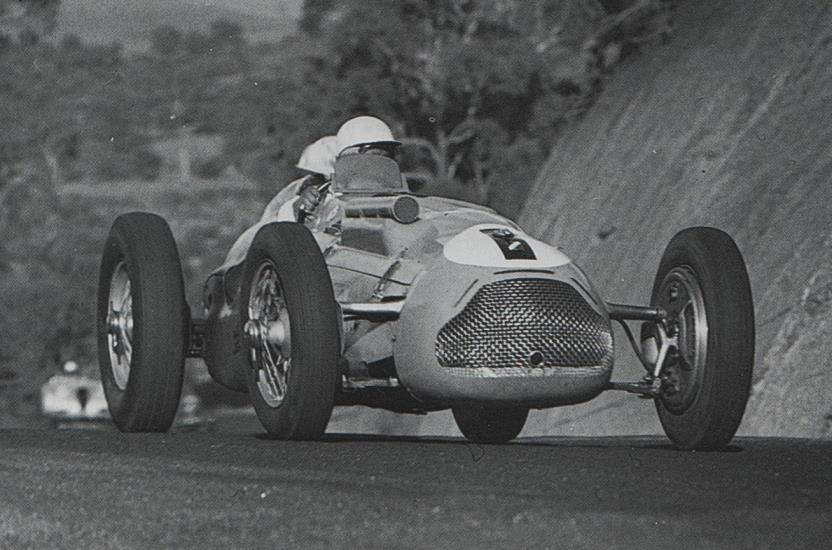
Doug Whiteford won the race driving a Talbot-Lago T26C

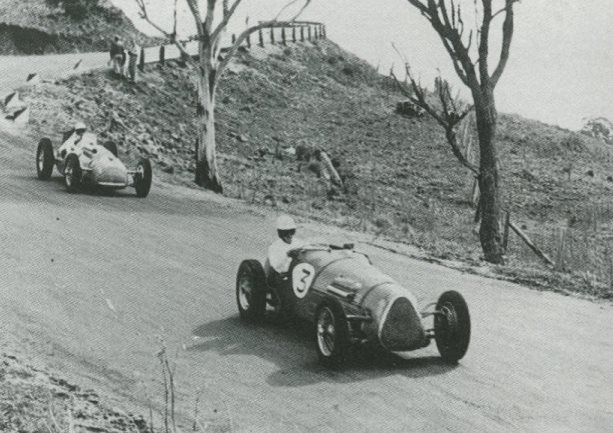
Stan Jones (Maybach) leads Whiteford early in the race. Jones placed second.

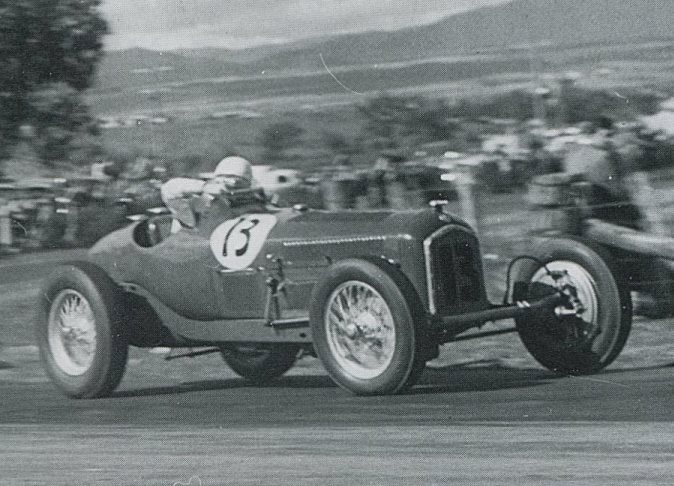
Bill Murray on his way to third place driving an Alfa Romeo Tipo B

The 1952 Australian Grand Prix was a Formula Libre motor race held at the Mount Panorama Circuit near Bathurst, in New South Wales, Australia on 14 April 1952. The race had 43 starters and was held over 38 laps of the six kilometre circuit, a total distance of 235 kilometres. A crowd of 15,000 watched the race, which was organised by the Australian Sporting Car Club.

The race, which is recognised by Motorsport Australia as the seventeenth Australian Grand Prix, was won by Doug Whiteford driving a Talbot-Lago T26C Formula One car. It was Whiteford's second Australian Grand Prix victory.

== Classification ==
Results as follows.

Pos	No.	Driver	Car / Engine	Entrant	Laps	Time / Remarks
1	1	(Australia) Doug Whiteford	Talbot-Lago T26C / Talbot-Lago 4.5L	D Whiteford	38	1h 57m 44s
2	3	(Australia) Stan Jones	Maybach Special Mk.1 / Maybach 4.3L	SJ Jones	38	2h 02m 04s
3	13	(Australia) Bill Murray	Alfa Romeo Tipo B / Alvis 4.4L	W Murray	38	2h 05m 08s
4	5	(Australia) Jack Murray	Allard J2 / Cadillac 4.4L	JE Murray	38	2h 06m 04s
5	30	(Australia) Harry Monday	Mercury Special / Mercury 4.0L	HS Monday	38	2h 09m 34s
6	15	(Australia) Tom Sulman	Maserati 4CL / Maserati 1.5L	TN Sulman	38	2h 11m 05s
7	27	(Australia) Clive Adams	Prad / Ford 2.2L	CE Adams	38	2h 11m 16s
8	41	(Australia) David McKay	MG TC Special / MG 1.3L	D McKay	38	2h 13m 21s
9	43	(Australia) Peter Critchley	MG TB Special / MG 1.3L	Better Used Cars NSW	38	2h 15m 27s
10	33	(Australia) J.S. Moody	Jaguar XK120 / Jaguar 3.4L	JS Moody	37	Flagged off
11	19	(Australia) Arthur Griffiths	MG TC Special / MG 1.3L	AA Griffiths	36	Flagged off
12	44	(Australia) Ron Ward	MG TC Special / MG 1.3L	RS Ward	35	Flagged off
13	35	(Australia) Bill McLachlan	Bugatti Type 37A / Ford 3.6L	DA McLachlan	34	Flagged off
14	32	(Australia) John Calvert	Jaguar XK120 / Jaguar 3.4L	J Calvert	34	Flagged off
15	16	(Australia) Puss Catlin (Australia) Peter Menere	Bugatti Type 35B / Bugatti s/c 2.3L	P Menere	34	Flagged off
16	11	(Australia) Jack Saywell	Cooper Mk.V / JAP 1.0L	J Saywell	32	Flagged off
17	40	(Australia) Silvio Massola	HRG Special / HRG 1.5L	S Massola	29	Flagged off
Ret	42	(Australia) John Nind	MG TB Special / MG 1.3L	JP Nind	34	
Ret	39	(Australia) T.G. Humphries	HRG Special / HRG 1.5L	TG Humphries	33	
Ret	46	(Australia) Phil Harrison	MG TD Special / MG 1.3L	PC Harrison	27	
Ret	18	(Australia) Curley Brydon	MG TC Special / MG s/c 1.3L	AH Brydon	27	Split fuel tank
Ret	38	(Australia) Ron Reid	Terraplane Special / Terraplane 3.6L	RM Reid	24	Engine noise
Ret	36	(Australia) Alec Mildren	Riley Nine Imp / Riley 1.5L	AG Mildren	24	Black flagged
Ret	26	(Australia) Bill Wilcox	Dodge Special / Dodge 4.0L	WH Wilcox	24	Black flagged
Ret	22	(Australia) Harry Thompson	HRG / HRG 1.5L	Redex Products NSW	24	
Ret	21	(Australia) Ian Mountain	M.Y.F. Special / Ford 4.2L	IK Mountain	24	
Ret	34	(Australia) Frank Roberts	Jaguar XK120 / Jaguar 3.4L	FK Roberts	23	
Ret	17	(Australia) Julian Barrett	BWA Special / Frazer Nash 1.5L	J St. Q Barrett	19	
Ret	28	(Australia) Peter Lowe	Bugatti Type 37 / Holden 2.2L	PS Lowe	17	Distributor
Ret	11	(Australia) Stan Mossetter	Rizzo Riley Special / Riley 1.5L	S Mossetter	16	
Ret	4	(Australia) Wally Feltham	Alta / Alta 2.0L	WD Feltham	15	
Ret	7	(Australia) John Crouch	Cooper Mk.V / JAP 1.1L	JF Crouch	15	Suspension
Ret	25	(Australia) George Pearse	MG TC Special / MG	GE Pearse	12	
Ret	12	(Australia) Dick Bland	Riley Dixon / Riley 1.5L	AG Mildren	11	
Ret	20	(Australia) Jesse Griffiths	George Reed Special / Ford 4.0L	JJ Griffiths	11	
Ret	24	(Australia) Vin Maloney	MG TC Special / MG 1.3L	VA Maloney	11	
Ret	23	(Australia) Dick Cobden	Cooper Mk.V / JAP 0.5L	R Cobden	10	Dropped valve
Ret	14	(Australia) Eldred Norman	Maserati 6C / Maserati 1.5L	E de B Norman	10	Blow off valve
Ret	8	(Australia) Lloyd Hirst	Cooper Mk.V / JAP 1.1L	FL Hirst	8	
Ret	10	(Australia) Mischa Ravdell	Cooper Mk.V / Vincent 1.0L	M Ravdell	7	
Ret	6	(Australia) Bill Craig	Cooper Mk.V / JAP 1.1L	WJ Craig	6	
Ret	9	(Australia) Frank Kleinig	Kleinig-Hudson 8 Special / Hudson 4.4L	F Kleinig	4	Valve spring
Ret	31	(Australia) Ken Tubman	MG K3 Magnette / MG 1.1L	KV Tubman	1	
DNS	29	(Australia) Peter McKenna	BMW 328 / BMW 2.0L	P McKenna	-	Practised
DNS	45	(Australia) Ron Feast	MG TB Special / MG 1.3L	RJ Feast	-	Practised
DNS	2	(Australia) Lex Davison	Alfa Romeo P3	AN Davison	-	Timing gear

Note: Competitors still running when the winner completed the race were allowed to continue racing until the race time limit flag was shown. Nine cars completed the full race distance and a further eight were "flagged off".

== Notes ==
- Starters: 43
- Winner's average speed: 76 mph
- Fastest lap: Doug Whiteford – 3'02
- Fastest speed through quarter-mile: Stan Jones (Maybach), 141.8 mph

== Handicap ==
The race incorporated a concurrent handicap award which was won by Harry Monday (Mercury Special), 12 seconds ahead of Doug Whiteford. Minor placings were taken by Bill Murray, Clive Adams and David McKay.

This was to be the last Australian Grand Prix to include a handicap section.

== References & notes ==
Preceded by 1951 Australian Grand Prix	Australian Grand Prix; 1952	Succeeded by 1953 Australian Grand Prix
