= 1957 Victorian Tourist Trophy =

The 1957 Victorian Tourist Trophy was a motor race for Sports Cars staged at the Albert Park Circuit in Victoria, Australia on 17 March 1957. The race was contested over 32 laps, a total distance of 100 miles. It was the main event at the 17 March race meeting organised by the Light Car Club of Australia and promoted by the Albert Park Motor Race Committee.

The race was won by Doug Whiteford driving a Maserati 300S.

== Results ==
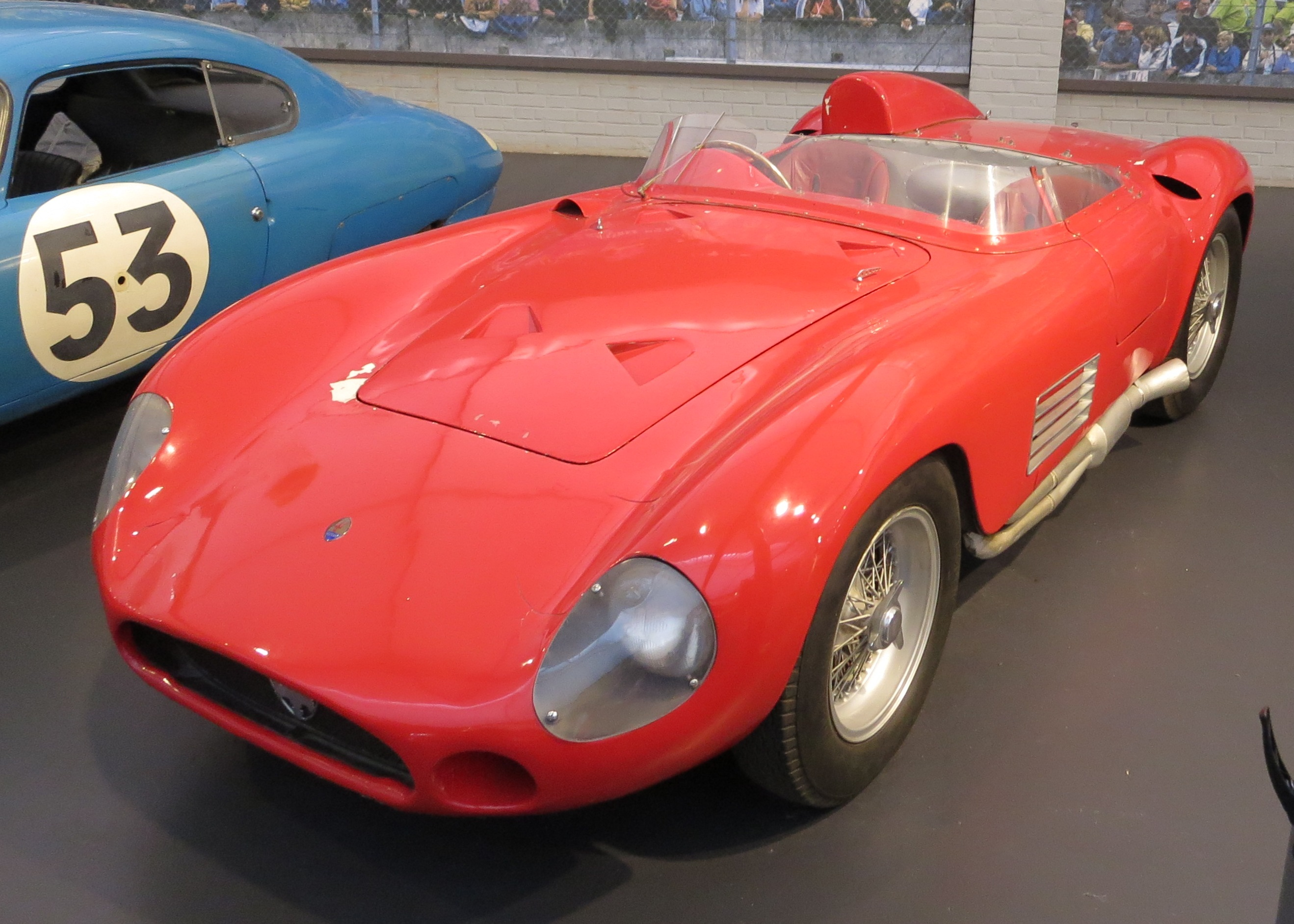
Doug Whiteford won the race driving a Maserati 300S similar to the example pictured

Position	Drivers	No.	Car	Entrant	Class	Class pos.	Laps
1	Doug Whiteford	6	Maserati 300S	D. Whiteford	Open Class	1	32
2	Bill Pitt	1	Jaguar D-Type	W. L. Pitt	Open Class	2	32
3	Bill Patterson	18	Cooper T39 Coventry Climax	Bill Patterson Motors Pty. Ltd.	1101-1500 cc	1	32
4	Paul England	15	Ausca Holden	P. England	1501-2750 cc	1	32
5	Derek Jolly	22	Decca Special	D. E. Jolly	Up to 1100 cc	1	32
6	Alan Mackay	20	Cooper Coventry Climax	A. Mackay	Up to 1100 cc	2	32
7	N. Hamilton	17	Porsche Spyder	N. Hamilton	1101-1500 cc		
8	Bill Coad	14	Vauxhall Special	W. F. Coad	1501-2750 cc		
9	Harry Firth	55	Triumph Special	G. W. Baillieu	1501-2750 cc		
10	John Bryson	3	Jaguar XK140 Coupe	J. N. B. Bryson	Open Class		
11	G. R. Swanson	27	Austin-Healey	G. R. Swanson	1501-2750 cc		
12	A. L. Jack	16	Triumph TR3	Brifield Service Station	1501-2750 cc		
13	G. E. Lawson	36	MG	G. E. Lawson	1101-1500 cc		22
DNF	Ron Phillips	9	Austin-Healey 100S	J and R Phillips	1501-2750 cc		
DNF	C. W. Miller	24	Austin-Healey	C. W. Miller	1501-2750 cc		
DNF	Tom Sulman	8	Aston Martin DB3S	T. Sulman	Open Class		15
DNF	S. Thompson	43	MG		1101-1500cc		7

=== Notes ===
- Entries: 20
- Starters: 17
- Finishers: 13
- Winner's race time: 66 minutes 45 seconds
- Fastest Lap: Doug Whiteford (Maserati 300S), 2 minutes 1.5 seconds (92.5 mph)
- Attendance: 15,000
