= Albert Park Circuit =

Motorsport race track in Melbourne, Australia

- Albert Park Circuit (2021–present)
- Interactive track map
- Location: Albert Park, Melbourne, Victoria, Australia
- Coordinates: 37°50′59″S 144°58′6″E
- Capacity: ~125,000 (44,000 seating)
- FIA Grade: 1
- Opened: 20 November 1953; 72 years ago Re-opened: 7 March 1996; 30 years ago
- Closed: 30 November 1958; 67 years ago
- Major events: Current: Formula One; Australian Grand Prix (1996–2019, 2022–present); Former: Australian Drivers' Championship (1957–1958)

Grand Prix Circuit (2021–present)
- Surface: Asphalt
- Length: 5.278 km (3.280 mi)
- Turns: 14
- Race lap record: 1:19.813 ( (Monaco) Charles Leclerc, Ferrari SF-24, 2024, F1)

Grand Prix Circuit (1996–2020)
- Surface: Asphalt
- Length: 5.303 km (3.295 mi)
- Turns: 16
- Race lap record: 1:24.125 ( (Germany) Michael Schumacher, Ferrari F2004, 2004, F1)

Original Circuit (1953–1958)
- Length: 5.027 km (3.124 mi)
- Turns: 9
- Race lap record: 1:50.0 ( (United Kingdom) Stirling Moss, Cooper T45, 1958, Formula Libre)

The Albert Park Circuit is a motorsport street circuit around Albert Park Lake in the suburb of Albert Park in Melbourne. It is used annually as a circuit for the Formula One Australian Grand Prix, the supporting Supercars Championship Melbourne SuperSprint and other associated support races. The circuit has an FIA Grade 1 licence.

Although the entire track consists of normally public roads, each sector includes medium to high-speed characteristics more commonly associated with dedicated racetracks facilitated by grass and gravel run-off safety zones that are reconstructed annually. However, the circuit also has characteristics of a street circuit's enclosed nature due to concrete barriers annually built along the Lakeside Drive curve, in particular, where run-off is not available due to the proximity of the lake shore.

== Design ==
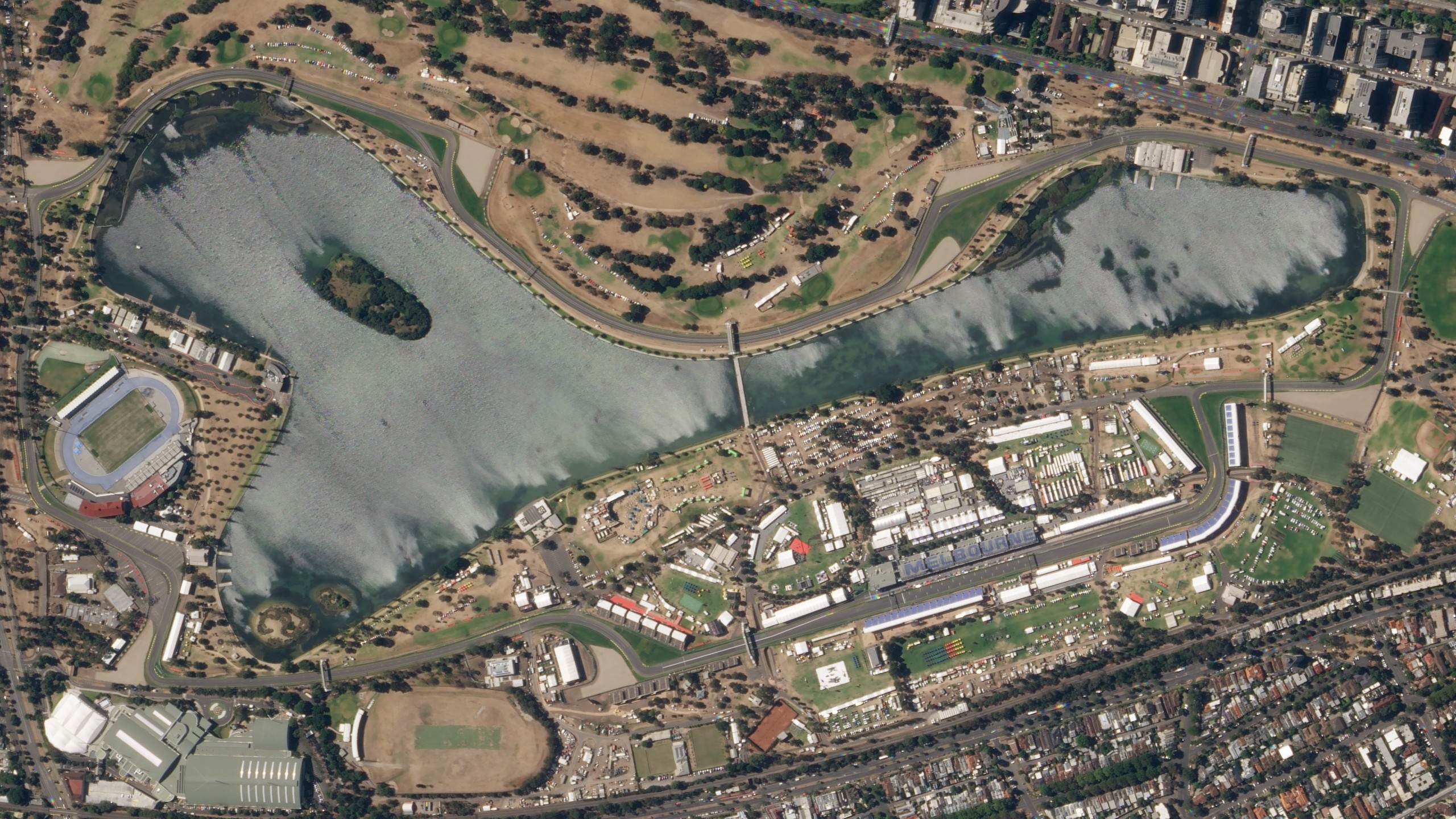
A satellite view of the circuit just before race weekend 2018

The circuit uses everyday sections of road that circle Albert Park Lake, a small man-altered lake (originally a large lagoon formed as part of the ancient Yarra River course) just south of the Central Business District of Melbourne. The road sections that are used were rebuilt before the inaugural event in 1996 to ensure consistency and smoothness. As a result, compared to other circuits that are held on public roads, the Albert Park track has quite a smooth surface. Before 2007 there existed only a few other places on the Formula 1 calendar with a body of water close to the track. Many tracks in the recent era, such as Valencia, Singapore and Abu Dhabi exist close to bodies of water.

The course is considered to be quite fast and relatively easy to drive, drivers having commented that the consistent placement of corners allows them to easily learn the circuit and achieve competitive times. However, the flat terrain around the lake, coupled with a track design that features few true straights, means that the track is not conducive to overtaking or easy spectating unless in possession of a grandstand seat.

Signage detailing access restrictions to Albert Park, covering the entire construction, race, and dismantle period of the 2026 Australian Grand Prix

Each year, most of the trackside fencing, pedestrian overpasses, grandstands, and other motorsport infrastructure are erected approximately three months before the Grand Prix weekend and removed within nine weeks after the event. The land around the circuit (including a large aquatic centre, a golf course, a Lakeside Stadium, some restaurants, and rowing boathouses) has restricted access during that entire period. Dissent is still prevalent among nearby residents and users of those other facilities, and some still maintain a silent protest against the event. Nevertheless, the event is reasonably popular in Melbourne and Australia (with a large European population and a general interest in motorsport). Middle Park Stadium, the home of South Melbourne FC was demolished in 1994 due to expansion at Albert Park.

Grand Prix Circuit layout between 1996 and 2020

The Grand Prix regularly draws crowds of over 270,000 spectators, with the 2024 event drawing a record crowd of 452,055, including 132,106 on the main raceday. There has never been a night race at Albert Park, although the 2009 and 2010 events both started at 5:00 p.m. local time. The current contract for the Grand Prix at the circuit concludes in 2035.

== Everyday access ==
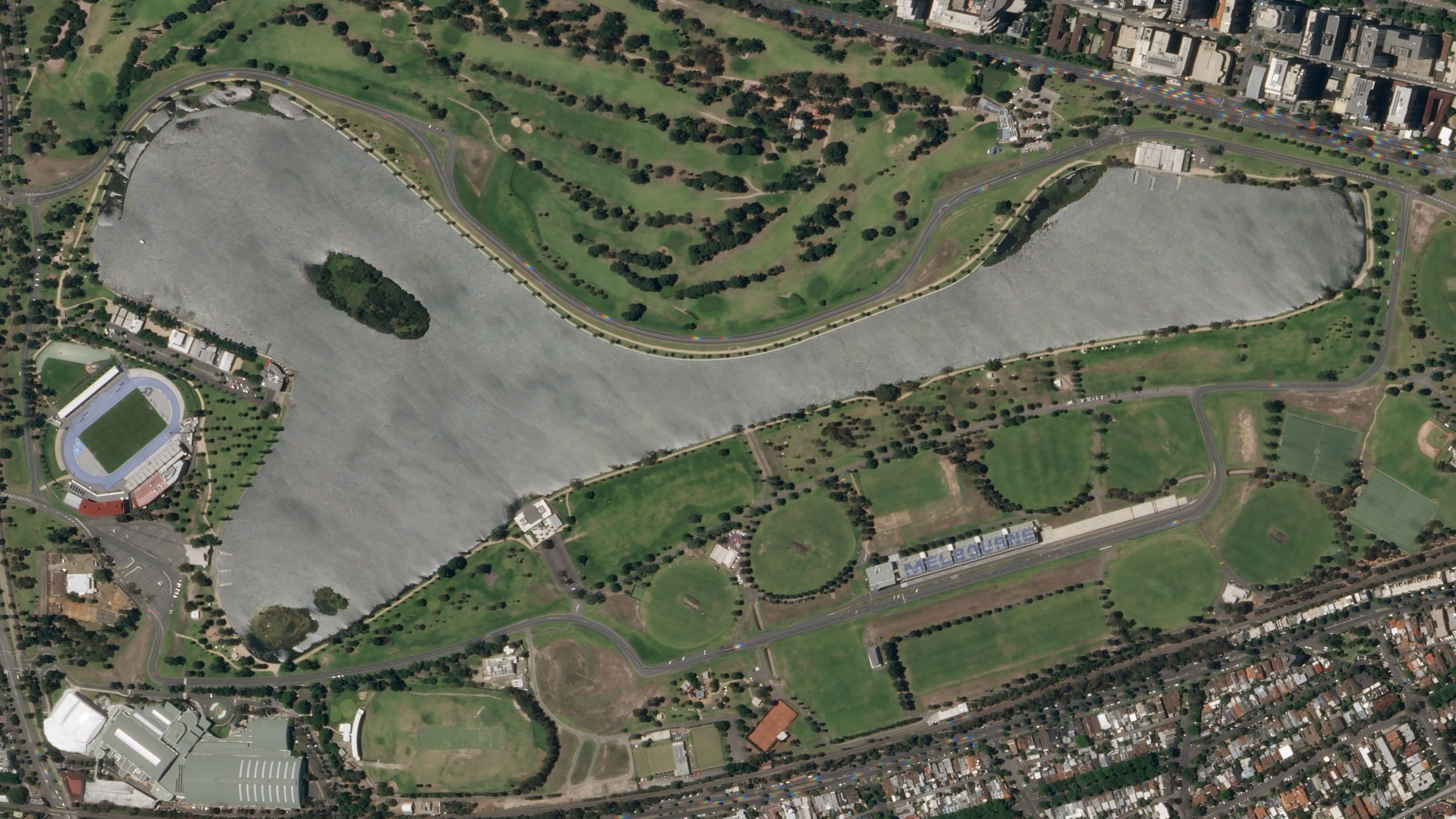
The Melbourne Grand Prix Circuit old layout in December 2017, while open to the public

During the nine months of the year when the track is not required for Grand Prix preparation or the race weekend, most of the track can be driven by ordinary street-registered vehicles either clockwise or anti-clockwise.

Only the sections between turns 3, 4, and 5, then 5 and 6, differ significantly from the race track configuration. Turn 4 is replaced by a car park access road running directly from turns 3 to 5. Between turns 5 and 6, the road is blocked. It is possible to drive from turn 5 on to Albert Road and back on to the track at turn 7 though three sets of lights control the flow of this option. The only set of lights on the actual track is halfway between turns 12 and 13, where drivers using Queens Road are catered for. The chicanes at turns 11 and 12 are considerably more open than that used in the Grand Prix, using the escape roads. Turn 9 is also a car park and traffic is directed down another escape road.

The speed limit for road cars is generally 40 km/h (25 mph), while some short sections have a speed limit of 50 km/h (31 mph), which is still slower than an F1 car under pit lane speed restrictions. The back of the track, turns 7 to 13 inclusive, is known as Lakeside Drive. Double lines separate the two-way traffic along most of Lakeside Drive with short road islands approximately every 50 m (55 yd) which means overtaking is illegal here. Black swans live and breed in Albert Park, and frequently cross the road causing traffic delays, sometimes with up to six cygnets (young swans).

Approximately 80% of the track edge is lined with short parkland-style chain-linked fencing leaving normal drivers less room for error than F1 drivers have during race weekend. There is however substantial shoulder room between the outside of each lane and the fencing, which is used as parking along Aughtie Drive during the other nine months.

== History ==
=== Albert Park Circuit (1953–1958) ===
Prior to World War II, attempts were made to use Albert Park for motor racing. The first was in 1934 but failed due to opposition, and a second attempt for a motorcycle race in 1937 similarly failed. Finally in 1953 the Light Car Club of Australia were able to secure use of the circuit for that year's Australian Grand Prix.

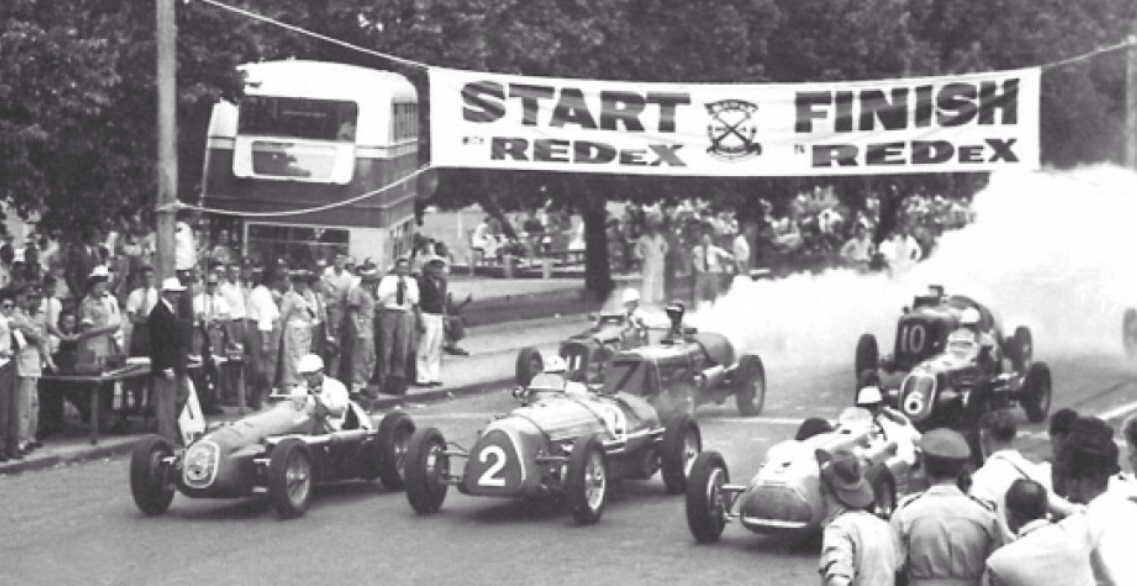
Start of the 1953 Australian Grand Prix.

Albert Park is the only venue to host the Australian Grand Prix in both World Championship and non-World Championship formats with an earlier configuration of the current circuit used for the race on two occasions during the 1950s. During this time racing was conducted in an anti-clockwise direction as opposed to the current circuit which runs clockwise.

Known as the Albert Park Circuit, the original 3.125 mi (5.029 km) course hosted a total of six race meetings:

- 21 November 1953 – featuring the 1953 Australian Grand Prix, won by Doug Whiteford (Talbot-Lago T26C)
- 26 and 27 March 1955 – the first Moomba meeting, which involved an alliance with the Moomba festival and The Argus newspaper, featuring the Moomba TT, won by Doug Whiteford (Triumph TR2) and the Argus Trophy, also won by Doug Whiteford (Talbot-Lago)

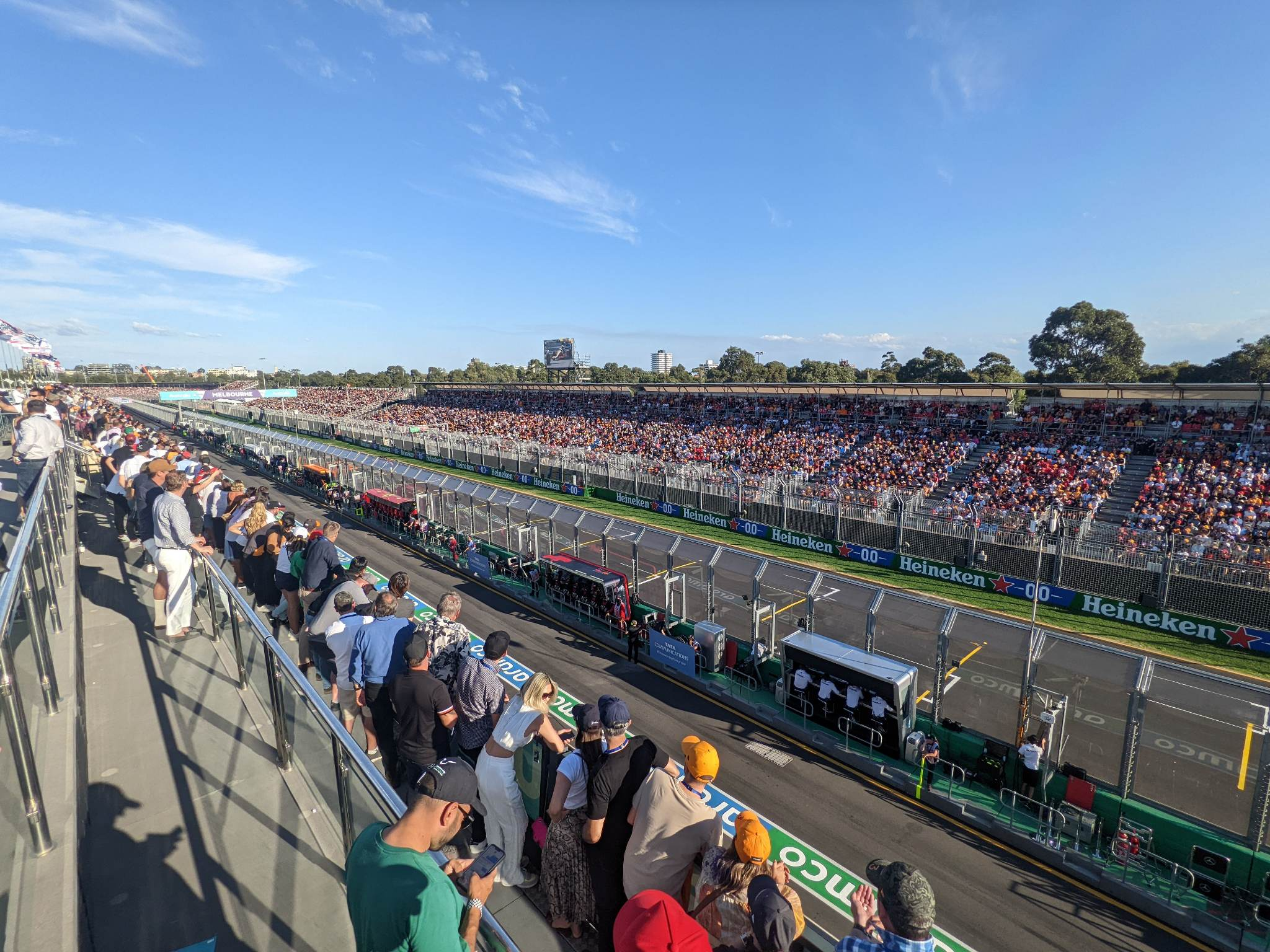
Albert Park circuit main straight, pictured from above teams' garages in 2022

- 11 March and 18 March 1956 – the second Moomba meeting, featuring the 1956 Moomba TT won by Tony Gaze (HWM Jaguar), and on the second weekend the 1956 Argus Trophy, won by Reg Hunt (Maserati 250F)
- 25 November & 2 December 1956 – featuring the 1956 Australian Tourist Trophy, won by Stirling Moss (Maserati 300S), and on the second weekend the 1956 Australian Grand Prix, also won by Stirling Moss (Maserati 250F)
- 17 and 24 March 1957 – the third Moomba meeting – featuring the Victorian Tourist Trophy won by Doug Whiteford (Maserati 300S), and the Victorian Trophy Race, won by Lex Davison (Ferrari 500). The Victorian Trophy Race was retrospectively designated as the second round of the 1957 Australian Drivers' Championship
- 23 and 30 November 1958 – featuring the 1958 Victorian Tourist Trophy, won by Doug Whiteford (Maserati 300S), and, on the second weekend, the 1958 Melbourne Grand Prix, (a round of the 1958 Australian Drivers' Championship), won by Stirling Moss (Cooper Coventry Climax)

The November 1958 meeting was the last on the original incarnation of the circuit, as it closed shortly after.

Following the cancellations of the Grand Prix in 2020 and 2021 due to the COVID-19 pandemic, track improvements were carried out that would be present in the 2022 running of the race. In addition to a widening of the pit lane, the track was widened at turns 1, 3, 6, and 15. Turn 13 was significantly altered, and turns 9 and 10 were removed. The updates served to improve safety and increase the opportunity for overtaking by creating a longer high-speed section and widening overtaking zones.

== Events ==
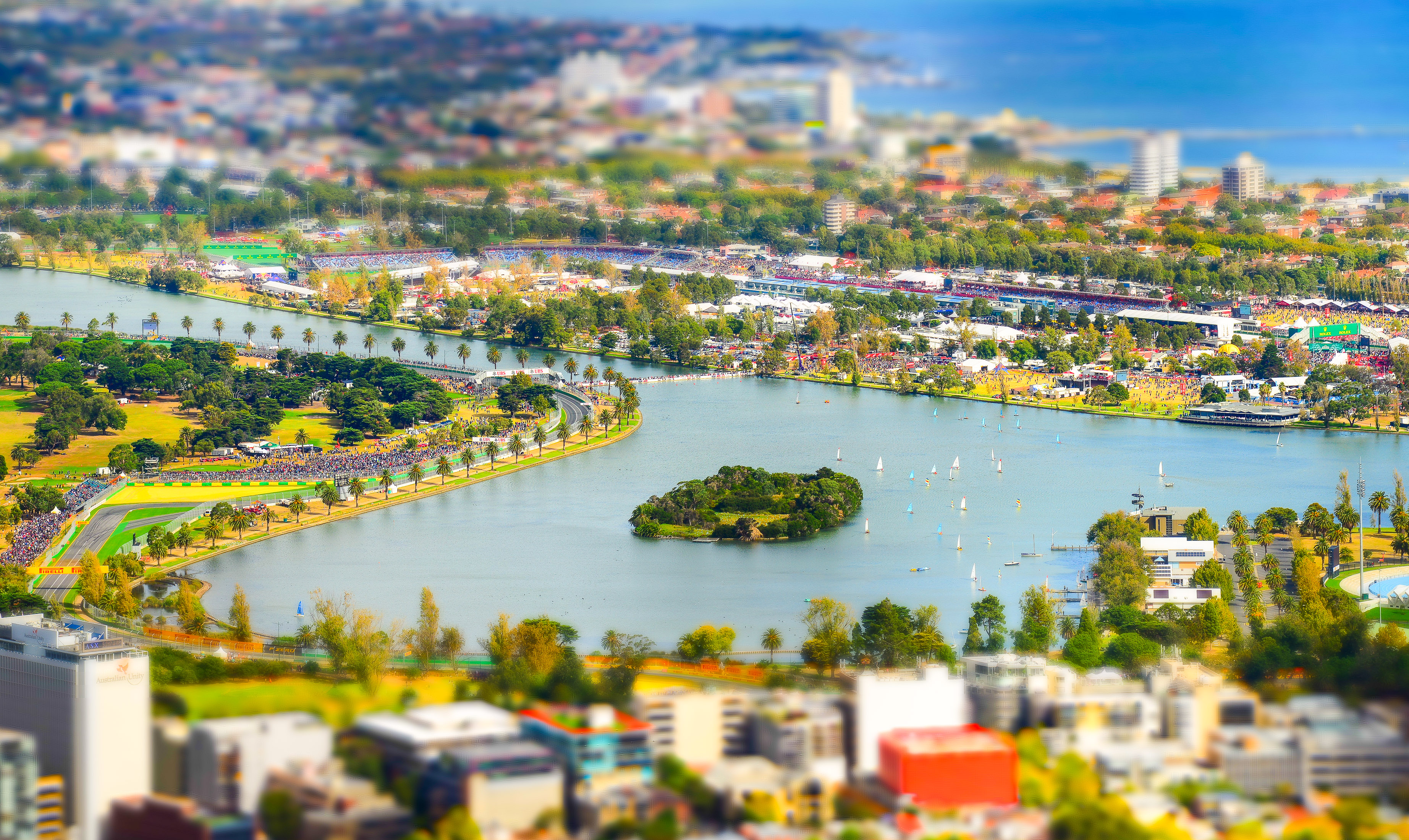
The 2014 Australian Grand Prix, viewed from the Eureka Skydeck

Current

- March: Formula One Australian Grand Prix, FIA Formula 2 Championship, FIA Formula 3 Championship, Supercars Championship Melbourne SuperSprint, Porsche Carrera Cup Australia Championship

Former

- Aussie Racing Cars (2007–2009)
- Australian Drivers' Championship (1957–1958, 1996)
- Australian Mini Challenge (2009–2010)
- Australian Formula 4 Championship (2019)
- Australian Formula Ford Championship (2009–2010, 2012)
- Australian Grand Prix Formula Libre (1953, 1956)
- Australian GT Championship (2008–2010, 2016–2019)
- Australian Tourist Trophy (1956)
- Ferrari Challenge Asia-Pacific (2018–2019)
- Porsche Supercup (1999)
- S5000 Australian Drivers' Championship (2022)
- Supercars Championship
  - Supercars Challenge (1996–2006, 2008–2017)
- V8 Ute Racing Series (2005–2007)

== Race lap records ==
The fastest pole position lap recorded at the Albert Park Circuit is 1:15.096, set by Lando Norris during the 2025 Formula One season in the McLaren MCL39. As of March 2024, the fastest official race lap records at the Albert Park Circuit are listed as:

Category	Time	Driver	Vehicle	Date
Grand Prix Circuit (2021–present): 5.278 km (3.280 mi)
Formula One	1:19.813	(Monaco) Charles Leclerc	Ferrari SF-24	24 March 2024
FIA F2	1:30.712	(Denmark) Frederik Vesti	Dallara F2 2018	2 April 2023
FIA F3	1:34.405	(Switzerland) Grégoire Saucy	Dallara F3 2019	2 April 2023
S5000	1:40.3696	(Australia) Aaron Cameron	Ligier JS F3-S5000	8 April 2022
Supercars Championship	1:46.006	(Australia) Scott Pye	Holden Commodore (ZB)	9 April 2022
Porsche Carrera Cup	1:47.9868	(Australia) Max Vidau	Porsche 911 (992 I) GT3 Cup	1 April 2023
Grand Prix Circuit (1996–2020): 5.303 km (3.295 mi)
Formula One	1:24.125	(Germany) Michael Schumacher	Ferrari F2004	7 March 2004
Formula Holden	1:49.246	(Australia) Todd Kelly	Reynard 92D	March 1998
Formula Three	1:50.8640	(Brazil) Bruno Senna	Dallara F304	30 March 2006
Formula 5000	1:54.6975	(New Zealand) Ken Smith	Lola T430	28 March 2010
GT3	1:54.7311	(New Zealand) Craig Baird	Mercedes-AMG GT3	22 March 2018
Group 7	1:55.541	(United Kingdom) Michael Lyons	March 717	17 March 2013
Supercars Championship	1:55.7280	(Australia) Chaz Mostert	Ford Mustang S550	15 March 2019
Porsche Carrera Cup	1:58.3294	(Australia) Cooper Murray	Porsche 911 (991 II) GT3 Cup	16 March 2019
Ferrari Challenge	2:00.0713	(Indonesia) Renaldi Hutasoit	Ferrari 488 Challenge	25 March 2018
Nations Cup	2:00.685	(Australia) Paul Stokell	Lamborghini Diablo GTR	8 March 2003
Formula 4	2:02.1683	(Australia) Jayden Ojeda	Mygale M14-F4	17 March 2019
Super Touring	2:03.547	(New Zealand) Jim Richards	Volvo 850	8 March 1997
Formula Ford	2:04.4805	(Australia) Chaz Mostert	Spectrum 012	27 March 2010
GT4	2:05.9644	(Australia) Ryan Simpson	McLaren 570S GT4	15 March 2019
Group A	2:07.9622	(Australia) Terry Lawlor	Nissan Skyline R32 GT-R	15 March 2015
Aussie Racing Cars	2:16.0196	(Australia) James Small	Holden Commodore-Yamaha	15 March 2008
Australian Mini Challenge	2:17.7962	(Australia) Chris Alajajian	Mini John Cooper Works Challenge	29 March 2009
Group C	2:18.9539	(Australia) Milton Seferis	Holden VH Commodore SS	14 March 2015
Pickup truck racing	2:22.3877	(Australia) Grant Johnson	Holden Commodore Ute	1 April 2006
Original Circuit (1953–1958): 5.027 km (3.124 mi)
Formula Libre	1:50.0	(United Kingdom) Stirling Moss	Cooper T45	30 November 1958
Sports Cars	1:55.8	(United Kingdom) Stirling Moss	Maserati 300S	25 November 1956

== See also ==
- Adelaide Street Circuit
