= List of Mount Panorama races =

Below are lists of significant car and motorcycle races that have been held at the Mount Panorama Circuit near Bathurst, New South Wales, Australia. As Australia's most famous motor racing circuit, Mount Panorama has had a significant influence on the history and industry of Australian motor racing.

== Major car races ==
Year	Date	Main event	Winner	Car
1938	18 April	Australian Grand Prix	(United Kingdom) Peter Whitehead	ERA B-Type
1939	10 April	New South Wales Grand Prix	(Australia) John Sherwood	MG NE Magnette
1939	2 October	Bathurst 150 miles road race	(Australia) John Snow	Delahaye Type 135 MS
1940	25 March	Bathurst Grand Prix	(Australia) Alf Barrett	Alfa Romeo Tipo B P3 "Monza"
1946	7 October	New South Wales Grand Prix	(Australia) Alf Najar	MG TB Special
1947	6 October	Australian Grand Prix	(Australia) Bill Murray	MG TC
1948	29 March	New South Wales Hundred	(Australia) John Barraclough	MG NE Magnette
1949	18 April	All Powers Long Handicap	(Australia) Arthur Rizzo	Rizzo Riley Special
1950	10 April	New South Wales 100	(Australia) Doug Whiteford	Ford V8 Special
1950	2 October	Under 1500cc 50 Mile Handicap	(Australia) Curley Brydon	MG TC Special
1950	2 October	Over 1500cc 50 Mile Handicap	(Australia) Warwick Pratley	George Reed Special Ford
1951	26 March	Redex 100	(Australia) Warwick Pratley	George Reed Special Ford
1951	1 October	Redex 50 Mile Championship	(Australia) Doug Whiteford	Talbot-Lago T26C
1952	14 April	Australian Grand Prix	(Australia) Doug Whiteford	Talbot-Lago T26C
1954	19 April	Bathurst 100	(Australia) Bill Clark	HRG 'Bathurst' Special
1955	11 April	Bathurst 100	(Australia) Curley Brydon	MG TC Special
1955	1 October	50 Mile Main Event	(Australia) Col James	MG TC Special
1956	2 April	Bathurst 100	(Australia) Lex Davison	Ferrari 625/750
1956	30 September	New South Wales Road Racing Championship for Racing Cars	(Australia) Stan Jones	Maserati 250F
1957	22 April	Bathurst 100; Australian Drivers' Championship, Round 3	(Australia) Jim Johnson	MG TC Special
1957	7 October	New South Wales Road Racing Championship; Australian Drivers' Championship, Round 6	(Australia) Lex Davison	Ferrari 625/750
1958	7 April	Bathurst 100	(Australia) Doug Whiteford	Maserati 300S
1958	5 October	Australian Tourist Trophy	(Australia) David McKay	Aston Martin DB3S
1958	6 October	Australian Grand Prix; Australian Drivers' Championship, Round 7	(Australia) Lex Davison	Ferrari 625/750
1959	30 March	Bathurst 100; Australian Drivers' Championship, Round 5	(New Zealand) Ross Jensen	Maserati 250F
1959	4 October	New South Wales Road Racing Championship; Australian Drivers' Championship, Round 8	(Australia) Bib Stillwell	Cooper T51 Climax
1960	18 April	Bathurst 100; Australian Drivers' Championship, Round 2	(Australia) Alec Mildren	Cooper T51 Maserati
1960	2 October	Australian GT Championship	(Australia) Leo Geoghegan	Lotus Elite
1960	2 October	Craven A International	(Australia) Jack Brabham	Cooper T51 Climax
1961	3 April	Craven A Gold Star; Australian Drivers' Championship, Round 2	(Australia) Bill Patterson	Cooper T51 Climax
1961	1 October	New South Wales Road Racing Championship	(Australia) Noel Hall	Cooper T51 Climax
1961	1 October	Australian Tourist Trophy	(Australia) Bib Stillwell	Cooper Monaco Climax
1962	23 April	Craven Filter Bathurst 100; Australian Drivers' Championship, Round 2	(Australia) Bib Stillwell	Cooper T53 Climax
1962	30 September	Bathurst Six Hour Classic	(Australia) Ian Geoghegan (Australia) Leo Geoghegan	Daimler SP250
1963	15 April	Bathurst 100	(Australia) Lex Davison	Cooper T62 Climax
1963	6 October	Armstrong 500	(Australia) Bob Jane (Australia) Harry Firth	Ford Cortina GT
1964	30 March	Craven Filter Mount Panorama '1500'	(Australia) Leo Geoghegan	Lotus 27 Ford
1964	4 October	Armstrong 500	(Australia) Bob Jane (Australia) George Reynolds	Ford Cortina GT
1965	19 April	Australian 1½ Litre Championship	(Australia) Bib Stillwell	Brabham BT14 Ford
1965	3 October	Armstrong 500	(Australia) Barry Seton (Australia) Midge Bosworth	Ford Cortina GT500
1966	11 April	Australian Touring Car Championship	(Australia) Ian Geoghegan	Ford Mustang
1966	2 October	Gallaher 500	(Finland) Rauno Aaltonen (Australia) Bob Holden	Morris Cooper S
1967	27 March	New South Wales Road Racing Championship	(Australia) Kevin Bartlett	Brabham BT11A Climax
1967	1 October	Gallaher 500	(Australia) Harry Firth (Australia) Fred Gibson	Ford XR Falcon GT
1968	15 April	Bathurst Gold Star Trophy; Australian Drivers' Championship, Round 1	(Australia) Phil West	Brabham BT23A Repco
1968	6 October	Hardie-Ferodo 500	(Australia) Bruce McPhee (Australia) Barry Mulholland	Holden HK Monaro GTS327
1969	7 April	Bathurst 100; Australian Drivers' Championship, Round 2	(Australia) Jack Brabham	Brabham BT31B Repco
1969	7 April	Australian Touring Car Championship, Round 2	(Australia) Ian Geoghegan	Ford Mustang
1969	5 October	Hardie-Ferodo 500	(Australia) Colin Bond (Australia) Tony Roberts	Holden HT Monaro GTS350
1970	30 March	Australian Touring Car Championship, Round 2	(Australia) Norm Beechey	Holden HT Monaro GTS350
1970	4 October	Hardie-Ferodo 500	(Canada) Allan Moffat	Ford XW Falcon GTHO Phase II
1971	12 April	Rothmans 3 Hour; Australian Manufacturers' Championship, Round 1	(Canada) Allan Moffat	Ford XW Falcon GTHO Phase II
1971	3 October	Hardie-Ferodo 500	(Canada) Allan Moffat	Ford XY Falcon GTHO Phase III
1972	3 April	Better Brakes 100	(Australia) Colin Bond	Holden LJ Torana GTR XU-1
1972	3 April	Australian Touring Car Championship, Round 3	(Australia) Ian Geoghegan	Ford XY Falcon GTHO Phase III
1972	1 October	Hardie-Ferodo 500; Australian Manufacturers' Championship, Round 3	(Australia) Peter Brock	Holden LJ Torana GTR XU-1
1973	30 September	Hardie-Ferodo 1000; Australian Manufacturers' Championship, Round 3	(Canada) Allan Moffat (Australia) Ian Geoghegan	Ford XA Falcon GT Hardtop
1974	6 October	Hardie-Ferodo 1000; Australian Manufacturers' Championship, Round 3	(Australia) John Goss (Australia) Kevin Bartlett	Ford XA Falcon GT Hardtop
1975	5 October	Hardie-Ferodo 1000; Australian Manufacturers' Championship, Round 3	(Australia) Peter Brock (Australia) Brian Sampson	Holden LH Torana SL/R 5000 L34
1976	3 October	Hardie-Ferodo 1000	(Australia) Bob Morris (United Kingdom) John Fitzpatrick	Holden LH Torana SL/R 5000 L34
1977	2 October	Hardie-Ferodo 1000	(Canada) Allan Moffat (Belgium) Jacky Ickx	Ford XC Falcon GS500 Hardtop
1978	1 October	Hardie-Ferodo 1000	(Australia) Peter Brock (New Zealand) Jim Richards	Holden LX Torana SS A9X Hatchback
1979	30 September	Hardie-Ferodo 1000	(Australia) Peter Brock (New Zealand) Jim Richards	Holden LX Torana SS A9X Hatchback
1980	5 October	Hardie-Ferodo 1000	(Australia) Peter Brock (New Zealand) Jim Richards	Holden VC Commodore
1981	4 October	James Hardie 1000	(Australia) Dick Johnson (Australia) John French	Ford XD Falcon
1982	3 October	James Hardie 1000; Australian Endurance Championship, Round 3	(Australia) Peter Brock (Australia) Larry Perkins	Holden VH Commodore SS
1983	2 October	James Hardie 1000; Australian Endurance Championship, Round 4	(Australia) John Harvey, (Australia) Peter Brock (Australia) Larry Perkins	Holden VH Commodore SS
1984	30 September	James Hardie 1000; Australian Endurance Championship, Round 4	(Australia) Peter Brock (Australia) Larry Perkins	Holden VK Commodore
1985	6 October	James Hardie 1000; Australian Endurance Championship, Round 4	(Australia) John Goss (West Germany) Armin Hahne	Jaguar XJ-S
1986	5 October	James Hardie 1000; Australian Endurance Championship, Round 4	(Australia) Allan Grice (Australia) Graeme Bailey	Holden VK Commodore SS Group A
1987	4 October	James Hardie 1000; World Touring Car Championship, Round 8	(Australia) Peter McLeod (Australia) Peter Brock (Australia) David Parsons	Holden VL Commodore SS Group A
1988	2 October	Tooheys 1000; Asia-Pacific Touring Car Championship, Round 1	(Australia) Tony Longhurst (Australia) Tomas Mezera	Ford Sierra RS500
1989	1 October	Tooheys 1000	(Australia) Dick Johnson (Australia) John Bowe	Ford Sierra RS500
1990	30 September	Tooheys 1000; Australian Endurance Championship, Round 2	(United Kingdom) Win Percy (Australia) Allan Grice	Holden VL Commodore SS Group A SV
1991	31 March	James Hardie 12 Hour	(Australia) Allan Grice (Australia) Peter Fitzgerald (Australia) Nigel Arkell	Toyota Supra
1991	6 October	Tooheys 1000; Australian Endurance Championship, Round 2	(New Zealand) Jim Richards (Australia) Mark Skaife	Nissan Skyline R32 GT-R
1992	19 April	James Hardie 12 Hour	(Australia) Mark Gibbs (Australia) Charlie O'Brien (Australia) Garry Waldon	Mazda RX-7
1992	4 October	Tooheys 1000	(Australia) Mark Skaife (New Zealand) Jim Richards	Nissan Skyline R32 GT-R
1993	11 April	James Hardie 12 Hour	(Australia) Alan Jones (Australia) Garry Waldon	Mazda RX-7
1993	3 October	Tooheys 1000	(Australia) Larry Perkins (Australia) Gregg Hansford	Holden VP Commodore
1994	3 April	James Hardie 12 Hour	(Australia) Neil Crompton (Australia) Gregg Hansford	Mazda RX-7
1994	2 October	Tooheys 1000	(Australia) Dick Johnson (Australia) John Bowe	Ford EB Falcon
1995	12 March	Australian Touring Car Championship, Round 3	(Australia) John Bowe	Ford EF Falcon
1995	1 October	Tooheys 1000	(Australia) Larry Perkins (Australia) Russell Ingall	Holden VR Commodore
1996	25 February	Australian Touring Car Championship, Round 3	(Australia) John Bowe	Ford EF Falcon
1996	6 October	AMP Bathurst 1000	(Australia) Craig Lowndes (New Zealand) Greg Murphy	Holden VR Commodore
1997	5 October	AMP Bathurst 1000	(Australia) Geoff Brabham (Australia) David Brabham	BMW 320i
1997	19 October	Primus 1000 Classic	(Australia) Larry Perkins (Australia) Russell Ingall	Holden VS Commodore
1998	4 October	AMP Bathurst 1000	(Sweden) Rickard Rydell (New Zealand) Jim Richards	Volvo S40
1998	15 November	FAI 1000 Classic	(Australia) Jason Bright (New Zealand) Steven Richards	Ford EL Falcon
1999	3 October	Bob Jane T-Marts V8 300	(Australia) James Brock	Holden VS Commodore
1999	3 October	Bob Jane T-Marts Bathurst 500	(Australia) Paul Morris	BMW 320i
1999	14 November	FAI 1000	(New Zealand) Greg Murphy (New Zealand) Steven Richards	Holden VT Commodore
2000	19 November	FAI 1000	(Australia) Garth Tander (Australia) Jason Bargwanna	Holden VT Commodore
2001	7 October	V8 Supercar 1000	(Australia) Mark Skaife (Australia) Tony Longhurst	Holden VX Commodore
2002	13 October	Bob Jane T-Marts 1000	(Australia) Mark Skaife (New Zealand) Jim Richards	Holden VX Commodore
2002	16 November	Bathurst 24 Hour	(Australia) Garth Tander (New Zealand) Steven Richards (Australia) Nathan Pretty (Australia) Cameron McConville	Holden Monaro 427C
2003	12 October	Bob Jane T-Marts 1000	(New Zealand) Greg Murphy (Australia) Rick Kelly	Holden VY Commodore
2003	22 November	Bathurst 24 Hour	(Australia) Peter Brock (New Zealand) Greg Murphy (Australia) Jason Bright (Australia) Todd Kelly	Holden Monaro 427C
2004	10 October	Bob Jane T-Marts 1000	(New Zealand) Greg Murphy (Australia) Rick Kelly	Holden VY Commodore
2005	9 October	Supercheap Auto 1000	(Australia) Mark Skaife (Australia) Todd Kelly	Holden VZ Commodore
2006	9 October	Supercheap Auto Bathurst 1000	(Australia) Craig Lowndes (Australia) Jamie Whincup	Ford BA Falcon
2007	8 April	WPS Bathurst 12 Hour	(Australia) Paul Morris (New Zealand) Craig Baird (Australia) Garry Holt	BMW 335i
2007	7 October	Supercheap Auto Bathurst 1000	(Australia) Craig Lowndes (Australia) Jamie Whincup	Ford BF Falcon
2008	10 February	WPS Bathurst 12 Hour	(Australia) Rod Salmon (Australia) Graham Alexander (Australia) Damien White	Mitsubishi Lancer Evo IX
2008	12 October	Supercheap Auto Bathurst 1000	(Australia) Craig Lowndes (Australia) Jamie Whincup	Ford BF Falcon
2009	22 February	WPS Bathurst 12 Hour	(Australia) Rod Salmon (Australia) Damien White (Australia) Tony Longhurst	Mitsubishi Lancer RS Evo X
2009	11 October	Supercheap Auto Bathurst 1000	(Australia) Garth Tander (Australia) Will Davison	Holden VE Commodore
2010	14 February	Armor All Bathurst 12 Hour	(Australia) Paul Morris (Australia) John Bowe (Australia) Garry Holt	BMW 335i
2010	10 October	Supercheap Auto Bathurst 1000	(Australia) Craig Lowndes (Australia) Mark Skaife	Holden VE Commodore
2011	6 February	Armor All Bathurst 12 Hour	(Hong Kong) Darryl O'Young (Germany) Marc Basseng (Germany) Christopher Mies	Audi R8 LMS GT3
2011	9 October	Supercheap Auto Bathurst 1000	(Australia) Garth Tander (Australia) Nick Percat	Holden VE Commodore
2012	26 February	Armor All Bathurst 12 Hour	(Hong Kong) Darryl O'Young (Germany) Christer Jöns (Germany) Christopher Mies	Audi R8 LMS GT3
2012	7 October	Supercheap Auto Bathurst 1000	(Australia) Jamie Whincup (Australia) Paul Dumbrell	Holden VE Commodore
2013	10 February	Liqui Moly Bathurst 12 Hour	(Germany) Thomas Jäger (Germany) Alexander Roloff (Germany) Bernd Schneider	Mercedes-Benz SLS AMG GT3
2013	13 October	Supercheap Auto Bathurst 1000	(Australia) Mark Winterbottom (New Zealand) Steven Richards	Ford FG Falcon
2014	9 February	Liqui Moly Bathurst 12 Hour	(Australia) John Bowe (Australia) Peter Edwards (Australia) Craig Lowndes (Finland) Mika Salo	Ferrari 458 Italia GT3
2014	12 October	Supercheap Auto Bathurst 1000	(Australia) Chaz Mostert (Australia) Paul Morris	Ford FG Falcon
2015	8 February	Liqui Moly Bathurst 12 Hour	(Japan) Katsumasa Chiyo (Belgium) Wolfgang Reip (Germany) Florian Strauss	Nissan GT-R Nismo GT3
2015	11 October	Supercheap Auto Bathurst 1000	(Australia) Craig Lowndes (New Zealand) Steven Richards	Holden VF Commodore
2016	7 February	Liqui Moly Bathurst 12 Hour; Intercontinental GT Challenge, Round 1	(Portugal) Álvaro Parente (New Zealand) Shane van Gisbergen (Australia) Jonathon Webb	McLaren 650S GT3
2016	27 March	Hi-Tec Oils Bathurst 6 Hour	(Australia) Nathan Morcom (Australia) Chaz Mostert	BMW 335i E92
2016	9 October	Supercheap Auto Bathurst 1000	(Australia) Will Davison (Australia) Jonathon Webb	Holden VF Commodore
2017	5 February	Liqui Moly Bathurst 12 Hour; Intercontinental GT Challenge, Round 1	(Australia) Craig Lowndes (Australia) Jamie Whincup (Finland) Toni Vilander	Ferrari 488 GT3
2017	16 April	Hi-Tec Oils Bathurst 6 Hour	(Australia) Luke Searle (Australia) Paul Morris	BMW M135i Hatch F20
2017	8 October	Supercheap Auto Bathurst 1000	(Australia) David Reynolds (Australia) Luke Youlden	Holden VF Commodore
2018	4 February	Liqui Moly Bathurst 12 Hour; Intercontinental GT Challenge, Round 1	(Netherlands) Robin Frijns (United Kingdom) Stuart Leonard (Belgium) Dries Vanthoor	Audi R8 LMS
2018	1 April	Hi-Tec Oils Bathurst 6 Hour	(Australia) Grant Sherrin (Australia) Iain Sherrin	BMW M4 F82
2018	7 October	Supercheap Auto Bathurst 1000	(Australia) Craig Lowndes (New Zealand) Steven Richards	Holden ZB Commodore
2019	3 February	Liqui Moly Bathurst 12 Hour	(Australia) Matt Campbell (Norway) Dennis Olsen (Germany) Dirk Werner	Porsche 911 GT3 R
2019	21 April	Hi-Tec Oils Bathurst 6 Hour	(Australia) Beric Lynton (Australia) Tim Leahey	BMW M3 F80 Competition
2019	13 October	Supercheap Auto Bathurst 1000	(New Zealand) Scott McLaughlin (France) Alexandre Prémat	Ford Mustang GT
2020	2 February	Liqui Moly Bathurst 12 Hour	(France) Jules Gounon (South Africa) Jordan Pepper (Belgium) Maxime Soulet	Bentley Continental GT3
2020	18 October	Supercheap Auto Bathurst 1000	(New Zealand) Shane van Gisbergen (Australia) Garth Tander	Holden ZB Commodore
2021	28 February	Repco Mount Panorama 500	(New Zealand) Shane van Gisbergen	Holden ZB Commodore
2021	4 April	Hi-Tec Oils Bathurst 6 Hour	(Australia) Shane Smollen (Australia) Rob Rubis (New Zealand) Shane van Gisbergen	BMW M4 F82
2021	5 December	Repco Bathurst 1000	(Australia) Chaz Mostert (Australia) Lee Holdsworth	Holden ZB Commodore
2022	17 April	Hi-Tec Oils Bathurst 6 Hour	(Australia) Thomas Sargent (Australia) Cameron Hill	BMW M2 Competition
2022	15 May	Liqui Moly Bathurst 12 Hour	(Australia) Kenny Habul (Austria) Martin Konrad (France) Jules Gounon (Germany) Luca Stolz	Mercedes-AMG GT3
2022	9 October	Repco Bathurst 1000	(New Zealand) Shane van Gisbergen (Australia) Garth Tander	Holden ZB Commodore
2022	13 November	Supercheap Auto Bathurst International Endurance Championship 3 Hour	(Malaysia) Jefri Ibrahim (Australia) Broc Feeney	Mercedes-AMG GT3
2022	13 November	Supercheap Auto Bathurst International TCR Australia Series, Round 7	(Australia) Bailey Sweeney	Hyundai i30 N TCR
2023	5 February	Liqui Moly Bathurst 12 Hour	(Australia) Kenny Habul (Andorra) Jules Gounon (Germany) Luca Stolz	Mercedes-AMG GT3
2023	17 April	Hi-Tec Oils Bathurst 6 Hour	(Australia) Jayden Ojeda (Australia) Simon Hodges	BMW M4 F82
2023	8 October	Repco Bathurst 1000	(New Zealand) Shane Van Gisbergen (New Zealand) Richie Stanaway	Chevrolet Camaro ZL1-1LE
2023	12 November	Supercheap Auto Bathurst International	(France) Yann Ehrlacher	Lynk & Co 03 FL TCR
2024	18 February	Liqui Moly Bathurst 12 Hour	(Australia) Matt Campbell (Turkey) Ayhancan Güven (Belgium) Laurens Vanthoor	Porsche 911 GT3 R (992)
2024	31 March	Hi-Tec Oils Bathurst 6 Hour	(Australia) Simon Hodges (Australia) Jayden Ojeda (Australia) George Miedecke	BMW M4 F82
2024	13 October	Repco Bathurst 1000	(Australia) Brodie Kostecki (Australia) Todd Hazelwood	Chevrolet Camaro
2025	2 February	Liqui Moly Bathurst 12 Hour	(Brazil) Augusto Farfus (South Africa) Kelvin van der Linde (South Africa) Sheldon van der Linde	BMW M4 GT3
2025	20 April	Hi-Tec Oils Bathurst 6 Hour	(Australia) Dean Campbell (Australia) Cameron Crick	BMW M2 Competition
2025	12 October	Repco Bathurst 1000	(New Zealand) Matt Payne (Australia) Garth Tander	Ford Mustang GT

== Motorcycle races ==
Year	Date	Main event	Winner	Bike
1938	16 April	Australian 150th Celebrations Senior Tourist Trophy	(Australia) Leo Tobin	Norton International Model 30
1939	8 April	Australian Senior Grand Prix	(Australia) Bat Byrnes	Norton International Model 30
1940	23 March	New South Wales Senior Tourist Trophy	(Australia) Bat Byrnes	Norton International Model 30
1946	20 April	New South Wales Victory Senior Tourist Trophy	(Australia) Ron Kessing	Velocette MSS
1947	4 October	New South Wales Senior Grand Prix	(Australia) Eric McPherson	Norton International Model 40
1948	16 April	Australian Senior Tourist Trophy	(Australia) Frank Mussett	Velocette MSS
1949	16 April	Australian Senior Grand Prix	(Australia) Bat Byrnes	Norton International Model 30
1950	8 April	New South Wales Senior Grand Prix	(Australia) Harry Hinton	Norton Manx 30M
1950	8 April	New South Wales Open Grand Prix	(Australia) Laurie Hayes	Norton Manx 30M
1951	24 March	New South Wales Jubilee Senior Tourist Trophy	(Australia) Harry Hinton	Norton Manx 30M
1951	24 March	New South Wales Jubilee Open Tourist Trophy	(Australia) Harry Hinton	Norton Manx 30M
1951	29 September	Mount Panorama Senior Grand Prix	(Australia) Jack Kemp	Triumph Tiger 100
1952	12 April	New South Wales Senior Tourist Trophy	(Australia) Harry Hinton	Norton Manx 30M
1953	4 April	New South Wales International Senior Tourist Trophy	(Australia) Harry Hinton	Norton Manx 30M
1953	6 April	New South Wales International Unlimited Tourist Trophy	(Australia) Harry Hinton	Norton Manx 30M
1954	17 April	Australian Senior Tourist Trophy	(New Zealand) Rod Coleman	Norton Manx 30M
1955	9 April	New South Wales Senior Tourist Trophy	(Australia) Harry Hinton	Norton Manx 30M
1956	31 March	Bathurst Senior Tourist Trophy	(Australia) Jack Forrest	BMW RS54 Rennsport
1957	20 April	Bathurst Senior Tourist Trophy	(Australia) Jack Ahearn	Norton Manx 30M
1958	5 April	Bathurst Senior Tourist Trophy	(Australia) Eric Hinton	Norton Manx 30M
1959	28 March	Bathurst Senior Grand Prix	(Australia) Jack Ahearn	Norton Manx 30M
1960	16 April	Australian Senior Tourist Trophy	(Australia) Jack Ahearn	Norton Manx 30M
1961	1 April	New South Wales Senior Grand Prix	(Australia) Jack Ahearn	Norton Manx 30M
1962	21 April	New South Wales Senior Grand Prix	(Australia) Ken Rumble	Norton Manx 30M
1963	13 April	Bathurst Unlimited Tourist Trophy	(Australia) Kel Carruthers	Norton Manx 30M
1964	28 March	Bathurst Unlimited Tourist Trophy	(Australia) Kel Carruthers	Norton Manx 30M
1965	17 April	Bathurst Sesqui-Centenary Unlimited Tourist Trophy	(Australia) Kel Carruthers	Norton Manx 30M
1966	9 April	Australian Unlimited Tourist Trophy	(Australia) Ron Toombs	Henderson Matchless G50
1967	25 March	Bathurst Unlimited Tourist Trophy	(Australia) Ron Toombs	Henderson Matchless G50
1968	13 April	Australian Unlimited Grand Prix	(Australia) Ron Toombs	Henderson Matchless G50
1969	5 April	Bathurst Unlimited Grand Prix	(Australia) Jack Ahearn	Triumph Bonneville T120
1970	28 April	Bathurst Unlimited Grand Prix	(Australia) Ken Blake	Kawasaki H1R
1970	28 April	Bathurst Bi-Centenary Grand Prix	(Australia) Ron Toombs	Henderson Matchless G50
1971	10 April	Bathurst $10,000 Unlimited	(Australia) Bryan Hindle	Yamaha TR2
1972	1 April	Bathurst $10,000 Australian Unlimited Tourist Trophy	(Australia) Bill Horsman	Yamaha TR2B
1973	21 April	Bathurst $10,000 Australian Unlimited Grand Prix	(Australia) Bill Horsman	Yamaha TR3
1974	14 April	Chesterfield $20,000 Bathurst International Unlimited Grand Prix	(Australia) Warren Willing	Yamaha TZ700
1975	30 March	Chesterfield $20,000 Australian Unlimited Grand Prix	(Australia) Warren Willing	Yamaha TZ750A
1976	18 April	Chesterfield International Australian Unlimited Grand Prix	(Japan) Ikujiro Takai	Yamaha YZR750 0W31
1977	10 April	Golden Breed Australian Unlimited Grand Prix	(Japan) Ikujiro Takai	Yamaha YZR750 0W31
1978	26 March	Australian Unlimited Grand Prix	(Japan) Hideo Kanaya	Yamaha YZR750 0W31
1979	14 April	Arai 3 Hour	(Australia) Tony Hatton	Honda RSC1000
1979	15 April	Australian Unlimited Grand Prix	(Australia) Ron Bouldon	Yamaha TZ750E
1980	5 April	Arai 500	(Australia) Michael Cole	Honda RSC1000
1980	6 April	Australian Unlimited Grand Prix	(Australia) Andrew Johnson	Yamaha TZ750F
1981	18 April	Arai 500	(Australia) Greg Pretty	Yamaha XS1100
1981	19 April	Australian 500cc Grand Prix	(Australia) Ron Boulden	Yamaha TZ500G
1982	10 April	Arai 500	(New Zealand) Rodger Freeth	McIntosh Suzuki GSX1100
1982	11 April	Australian 500cc Grand Prix	(Australia) Ron Boulden	Yamaha TZ500J
1983	2 April	Arai 500	(Australia) Rob Phillis	Honda RS1000
1983	3 April	Australian 500cc Grand Prix	(Australia) Andrew Johnson	Honda RS500
1984	21 April	Arai 500	(Australia) Andrew Johnson	Honda VF860R
1984	22 April	Australian 500cc Grand Prix	(Australia) Andrew Johnson	Honda RS500
1985	6 April	Arai 500	(New Zealand) Rodger Freeth	McIntosh Suzuki GSX1100
1985	7 April	Australian 500cc Grand Prix	(Australia) Tony Hinton	Yamaha TZ500G
1985	7 April	Bathurst Centenary 1000cc Race	(Australia) Michael Dowson	Yamaha TZ750E
1986	29 March	Arai 500	(Australia) Kevin Magee	Yamaha FZR750
1986	30 March	Australian 1000cc Grand Prix	(Australia) Malcolm Campbell	Honda RS500
1987	11 April	Arai 500	(Australia) Rob Cox	Yamaha FZR750
1987	12 April	Aussieland Superbike Series, Round 2	(Australia) Michael Dowson	Yamaha FZR750
1988	2 April	Arai 500	(Australia) Michael Dowson (Australia) Mick Doohan	Yamaha FZR1000
1988	3 April	Australian 1000cc Grand Prix	(Australia) Mick Doohan	Yamaha FZR750R
1992	18 April	King of the Mountain	(Australia) Shawn Giles	Honda VFR750R RC30
1993	10 April	Australian Tourist Trophy	(Australia) Scott Mitchell	Yamaha FZR750R
1994	2 April	Australian Tourist Trophy	(Australia) Shawn Giles	Yamaha YZF750SP
2000	23 April	Bathurst Tourist Trophy	(Australia) Kevin Curtain	Yamaha YZF-R1
