= 1939 Bathurst 150 miles road race =

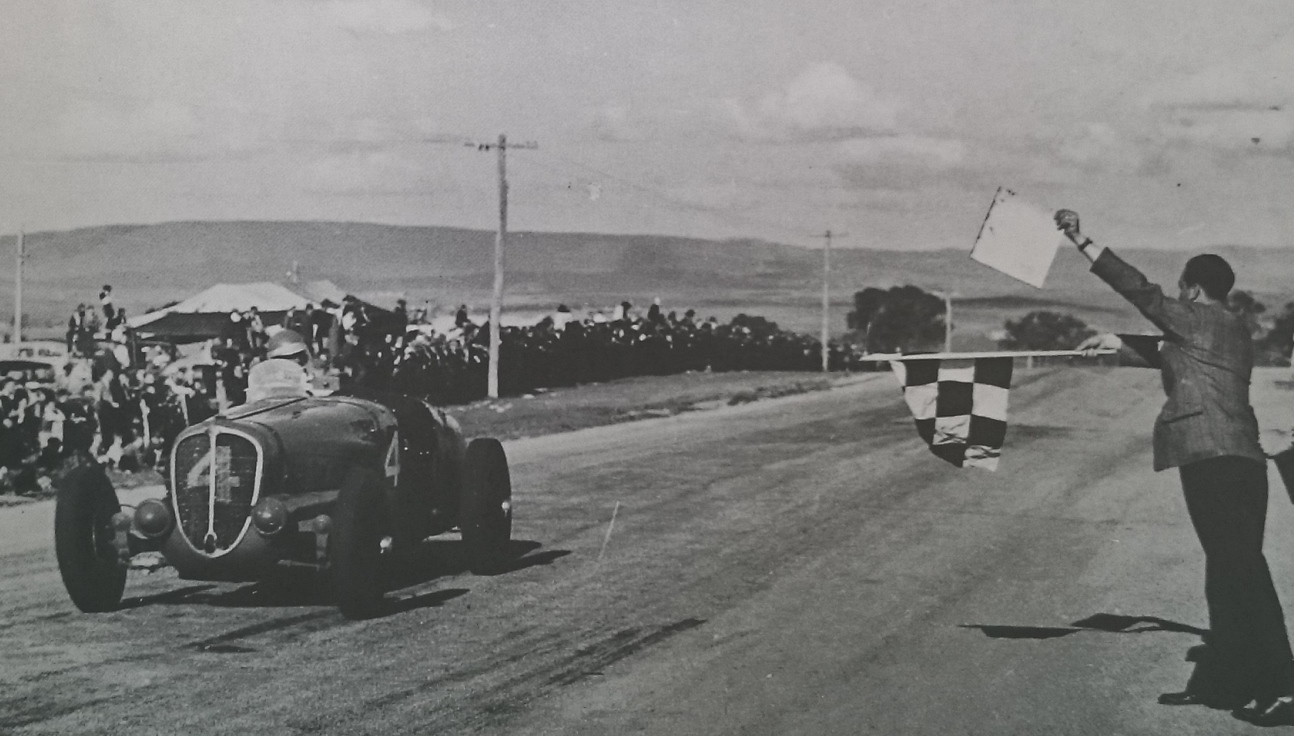
John Snow receives the chequered flag to win the 1939 Bathurst 150 miles road race in a Delahaye

The 1939 Bathurst 150 miles road race was a motor race staged at the Mount Panorama Circuit, Bathurst, New South Wales, Australia on 2 October 1939. The 37 lap race, which was conducted on a handicap basis, was organised by the New South Wales Light Car Club.

The race was won by John Snow driving a Delahaye.

== Results ==
Position	Driver	No.	Car	Entrant	Handicap	Race time / remarks	Laps
1	John Snow	4	Delahaye	J. F. Snow	7m 00s	2h 32m 15s	37
2	Frank Kleinig	2	Kleinig Hudson	F. Kleinig	4m 00s	2h 34m 09s	37
3	Bob Lea-Wright	16	Hudson Terraplane Special	R. A. Lea-Wright	20m 00s	2h 35m 15s	37
4	Bob Appleton	3	Ford V8 Special s/c	R. A. Appleton	4m 00s	2h 36m 09s	37
5	Charles Whatmore	12	Ford V8 Special s/c	C. W. Whatmore	17m 00s	2h 37m 01s	37
6	Alf Barrett	1	Alfa Romeo s/c	A. I. Barrett	Scratch	2h 37m 27s	37
7	John Crouch	7	Alfa Romeo s/c	J. F. Crouch	12m 00s	2h 42m 01s	37
8	Tom Lancey	26	MG TA	T. Lancey	26m 00s	2h 42m 34s	37
9	John Nind	19	MG TA	J. P. Nind	26m 00s	2h 42m 40s	37
10	John Suttor	20	MG TA	J. B. Suttor	26m 00s	2h 48m 17s	37
NC	H. Brewster	23	Austin Wasp	H. Brewster	34m 00s		
NC	Edison Waters	6	Jaguar SS100 special	E. Edison Waters	12m 00s		
DNF	John Barraclough	9	Alvis Terraplane	J. F. Snow	13m 00s	Universal joint	
DNF	Colin Dunne	24	MG K3 s/c	C. Dunne	10m 00s	Gearbox	35
DNF	George Reed		Ford V8				
DNF	Harry Monday	14	Ford V8	H. S. Monday	17m 00s	Handling	
DNF	Kevin Salmon	5	Salmon Motors Special	K. D. Salmon	11m 00s		14
DNF	Doug Robertson	18	MG NE	D. I. Robertson	20m 00s	Oil pressure	
DNF	Les Burrows	15	Hudson Terraplane Special	L. Burrows	18m 00s	Bearings	7
DNF	R. C. Mortimer	25	Wolseley Hornet	R. C. Mortimer	27m 00s	Bearings	
DNF	Ben Tarr	22	MG J3 s/c	A. D. Robertson	29m 00s	Cracked block	
DNF	Bill Conoulty	21	Austin 7 Comet s/c	T. W. Conoulty	29m 00s	Rolled	6
DNS	George Reed	11	MG Q s/c	L. F. Kelly	16m 00s		
DNS	T. Joshua	8	Frazer Nash Ford V8	G. M. Joshua	13m 00s		
DNS	Ben Tarr	17	Rajo Ford	B. Tarr	20m 00s	Practised	
DNS	H.Bartlett	10	MG Q s/c	H.Bartlett	16m 00s		

=== Notes ===
- Starters: 22
- Winner's average speed: 70.5 m.p.h.
- Fastest Time: Alf Barret, Alfa Romeo: 2h 03m 27 s
- Fastest Lap: Alf Barrett, Alfa Romeo,: 3m 05s (record)
