= 1940 Bathurst Grand Prix =

Australian motor race

Layout of the Mount Panorama Circuit (1938-1986)

The 1940 Bathurst Grand Prix was a motor race staged at the Mount Panorama road racing circuit near Bathurst in New South Wales, Australia on 25 March 1940. The race was contested on a handicap basis over a distance of 150 miles, comprising 37 laps of the course. It was promoted by the New South Wales Light Car Club.

The race was won by Alf Barrett (Alfa Romeo "Monza"), who also set fastest time and fastest lap, the latter being a new lap record.

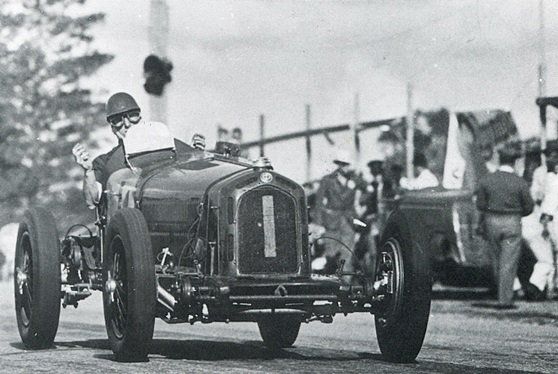
Race winner Alf Barrett (Alfa Romeo "Monza") contesting the 1940 Bathurst Grand Prix

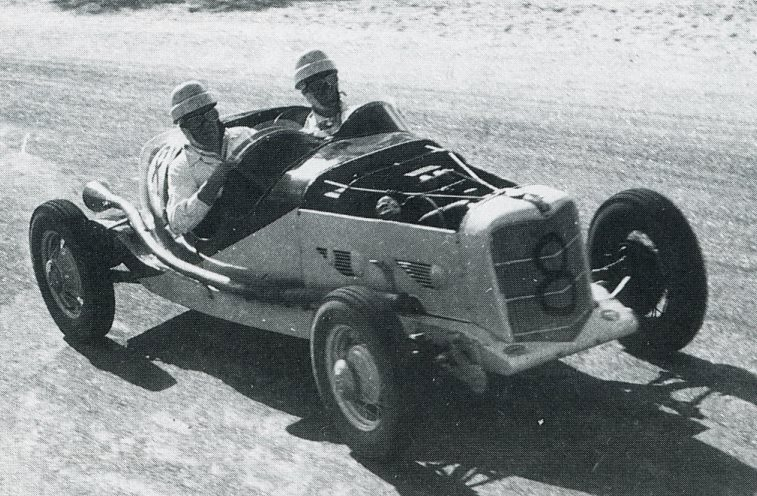
Jack Phillips & Ted Parsons (Ford V8 Special) placed ninth

== Results ==
Position	Driver	No.	Car	Entrant	Handicap	Run time	Race time	Laps
1	Alf Barrett	1	Alfa Romeo "Monza" s/c	A. Barrett	Scratch	1:59.45	1:49.45	37
2	John Snow	3	Delahaye	J. Snow	3½ mins	2:03.23	1:50.23	
3	Charles Whatmore	23	Ford V8 Special	C.W. Whatmore	16½ mins	2:19.15	1:52.07	
4	George Reed	11	Ford V8 Special	Geo. Reed	16½ mins	2:19.04		
5	John Crouch	7	Alfa Romeo	J.F. Crouch	13 mins	2:18.21		
6	Frank Kleinig	2	Hudson Special	F. Kleinig	3½ mins	2:08.55		
7	Paul Swedberg	18	Offenhauser	Paul Swedberg	7 mins	2:14.34		
8	John Barraclough	17	MG NE Magnette	Mrs M. Smith	22 mins	2:31.18		
9	Jack Phillips & Ted Parsons	8	Ford V8 Special	J.K. Phillips	13 mins	2:22.27		
DNF	Tom Lancey	16	MG NE Magnette	T. Lancey	22 mins			19+
DNF	Bill Reynolds	6	Alta Ford V8	Bill Reynolds	10 mins			19+
DNF	Harold Monday	14	Ford V8	H. Monday	20 mins			19+
DNF	Jim McMahon	15	Willys	J. McMahon	20 mins			19+
DNF	Les Burrows	10	Hudson	L. Burrows	16 mins			19+
DNF	K. Jolly	22	Singer 9	K. Jolly	40 mins			14
DNF	J.R.B. French	19	MG T	J.R.B. French	33 mins			7
DNF	Ron Ewing	12	Buick Special	R.M. Ewing	17½ mins			5
DNF	John Nind	20	MG TA	J.P. Nind	33 mins			5
DNF	Edison Waters	5	Bentley 4½ Litre s/c	E.E. Waters	26 mins			2
DNS	Rob Appleton	4	Ford Special s/c	R.A. Appleton	4½ mins			
DNS	Hope Bartlett	9	MG Q	Hope Bartlett	16 mins			
DNS	D. Field	21	MG TA	D. Field	33 mins			

=== Notes ===
- Entries: 22
- Non-starters: 3
- Starters: 19
- Finishers: 9
- Winner's average speed: "a little over 75 mph"
- Fastest lap: A. Barrett, 3m 4s, 78 mph (Lap record)
- Fastest time: A. Barrett
