= Allen Norton (motorcycle) =

British motorcycle manufacturer, 1990–1994

- Industry: Motorcycle manufacturer
- Founded: 1990 in Wiltshire, England
- Founder: Bernie Allen
- Defunct: 1994
- Headquarters: Great Bedwyn, United Kingdom
- Products: Norton Manx replicas

Allen Norton is a defunct British company that supplied replicas of 350 and 500 cc Norton Manx road racing motorcycles. The company was run by Bernie Allen in Great Bedwyn, near Marlborough, Wiltshire.

The company started to build replicas of the famous Norton Manx racers in 1990, based on the final 1961 Manx. Allen had been given the rights in 1989 after the death of Norton tuner Ray Petty and had received special permission to use the name "Norton" in England.

Except for the magnetos, all the components used were of new manufacture. The engines were supplied by Summerfield Engineering of Derbyshire, the frames came from Goodman Engineering and were made from Reynolds 531 tubing. The machines were fitted with a 5-speed gearbox and a belt primary drive. (The originals used a 4-speed gearbox and chain primary drive.) Although the original Manx machines were pure racers, Allen fitted a speedometer, horn and brake light so the machines could be ridden on the road.

The machines were renowned for their quality. Former Norton race engineer and designer Doug Hele commented on the Allen machines "They are better than when we made them".

Production numbers were low. Allen delivered the first machine in 1992, but was only able to build one every two weeks. He was 61 years old at the time. In 1994, the manufacturing rights passed to Preston, Lancashire engineer, Andy Molnar.
