= Matchless G50 =

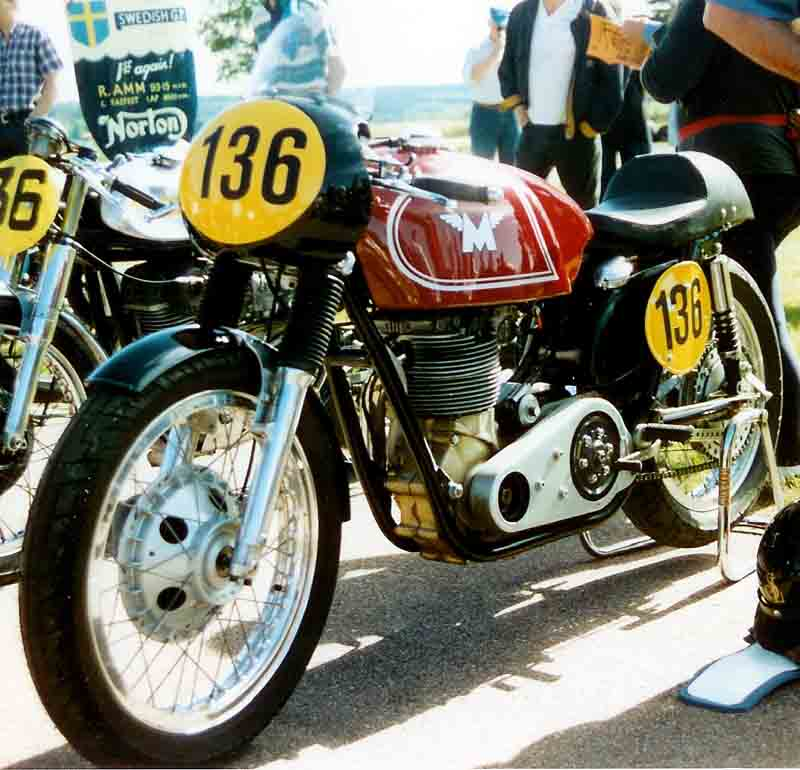
- Manufacturer: Associated Motorcycles Plumstead, London
- Production: 1958-1963
- Engine: 496,6 cc SOHC air cooled single
- Bore / stroke: 86 mm × 85.5 mm (3.39 in × 3.37 in)
- Power: 51bhp @ 7,200rpm
- Transmission: Four speed gearbox to chain final drive
- Brakes: drum brakes
- Weight: 320 pounds (150 kg) (dry)

The Matchless G50 is an historic racing British motorcycle made by Associated Motorcycles (AMC) at the former Matchless works in Plumstead, London. Developed in 1958 from the 350 cc AJS 7R, but with the engine capacity increased to 500 cc, 180 G50s were built in the next four years. Although less powerful than its main competitor the Norton Manx the G50 proved highly competitive at three hundred pounds and was faster round bends. If success is measured by longevity then this is the most successful Matchless motorcycle, and high specification replicas are still being produced to this day, although financial problems at AMC ended production in 1963.

== The G50 CSR ==
In 1963, the AMA decided that the G50 should not be allowed to race in the US as it was not based on a production street bike. Matchless solved the problem by creating a limited-production, street-legal G50 CSR, by fitting the G50 engine into the G80CS Scrambler frame.

The designation "CSR" "In AMC parlance stood for Competition Sprung Roadster"[Bacon Roy, AJS and Matchless postwar twins 1948–1969, page 39, Niton publishing, ISBN 978-0-9514204-7-8], Competition always referring to Scrambles in AMC speak. "This suffix[CSR] was first used in 1958. Earlier, competition[scrambles] models with no rear suspension were simply stamped "C". Later models with rear suspension were given the identification "CS". This was short for "competition sprung". When road versions were introduced, in 1958, the R was added. Hence, CSR means "competition sprung roadster". but they quickly got called the Coffee Shop racer.. It later became known as the Golden Eagle after the name was used in advertising (due to the gold finish of the engine casings).

There were just two colour options - bright blue with a tan seat or bright red and black with a black seat.

== Seeley Condor G50 ==
Financial problems at AMC ended production in 1963 and all the tooling and spares were sold to sidecar Grand Prix racer Colin Seeley in 1966. Seeley went on to develop the engine and made his own custom frames to produce a number of G50 'specials' some of which were known as the called the Seeley Condor. These exclusive motorcycles continue to be hand built to this day to individual customer specifications by TGA Ltd, now based in northern France. As well as building motorcycles from new parts, TGA also convert secondhand racing motorcycles for road use.

== Seeley G50Mk2 ==
The Seeley G50Mk2 racing motorcycles built by TGA Ltd are high specification with a Titchmarsh chassis, Walmsley G50 motor, 6 speed PGT gearbox and lightweight fairing.

== Tom Arter G50 ==
Motorcycle sponsor and tuner Tom Arter produced a G50 raced by Peter Williams with notable success. He led the 1967 500 cc World Championship after three rounds against the MV Agusta and Honda factory teams and their powerful multi-cylinder machines; however, he severely injured his ankle while competing in the 350 cc East German Grand Prix and was forced to withdraw from the remainder of the season.

Arter and Williams rebuilt the Matchless motorcycle in 1969 using a lighter, slimmer frame made from narrower-gauge tubing by Formula One chassis constructors Grand Prix Metalcraft. The lightweight chassis also benefitted from a slim, wind-cheating bodywork and was one of the first racing motorcycles to feature hydraulic disc brakes. The motorcycle was also the first to utilise six-spoke, solid-cast Elektron alloy wheels, which were designed by Williams himself at a time when wire-spoked wheels were considered the standard. The motorcycle was dubbed "cart wheels" and "artillery wheels" by British motorsport journalists due to its distinctive wheels.

Williams and Arter developed and modified the Matchless G50 into a proficient racing machine that extended the competitive life of the four-stroke single-cylinder engine during an era dominated by two-stroke engines. By 1969, the era of domination by British single-cylinder engines was over; however, their use of lightweight material and aerodynamics allowed the underpowered yet agile Matchless G50 compete with Agostini's more powerful MV Agusta.

Williams won the 1970 North West 200 500cc race and once again finished second to Agostini in the 1970 Senior TT on the Arter Matchless Special. He repeated his second-place finish behind Agostini aboard the Arter Matchless at the 1971 Isle of Man TT.

At the 1972 Hutchinson 100 held at the tight and technical Brands Hatch circuit, Williams used the Matchless' lightweight and agility to catch and pass Agostini’s MV Agusta 500 Three, as the reigning World Champion then crashed while pursuing Williams.

In the 1973 Senior TT against a field of powerful, twin cylinder motorcycles, Williams rode the Arter Matchless G50 to an impressive second place behind Jack Findlay (Suzuki). Williams' average of 100.62 mph was 2.6 seconds quicker than Mike Hailwood's winning speed in 1961 on a Norton Manx, making them the only two competitors at that point in time to have averaged over 100 mph on a single-cylinder machine in the Senior TT. His single-cylinder TT lap record would stand until 1997, when it was broken by Dave Morris riding a BMW F650.

== George Beale G50 replicas ==
Former Isle of Man TT winner George Beale set up George Beale Motorcycles in Coleorton, Leicestershire to make a range of replica motorcycles, including Matchless G50 racing motorcycles to a high specification which includes a special lightweight frame and swing arm, Ceriani forks and a magnesium six speed gear box with lightweight clutch.

== See also ==
- List of motorcycles of the 1950s
