= MG R-type =

MG R-Type
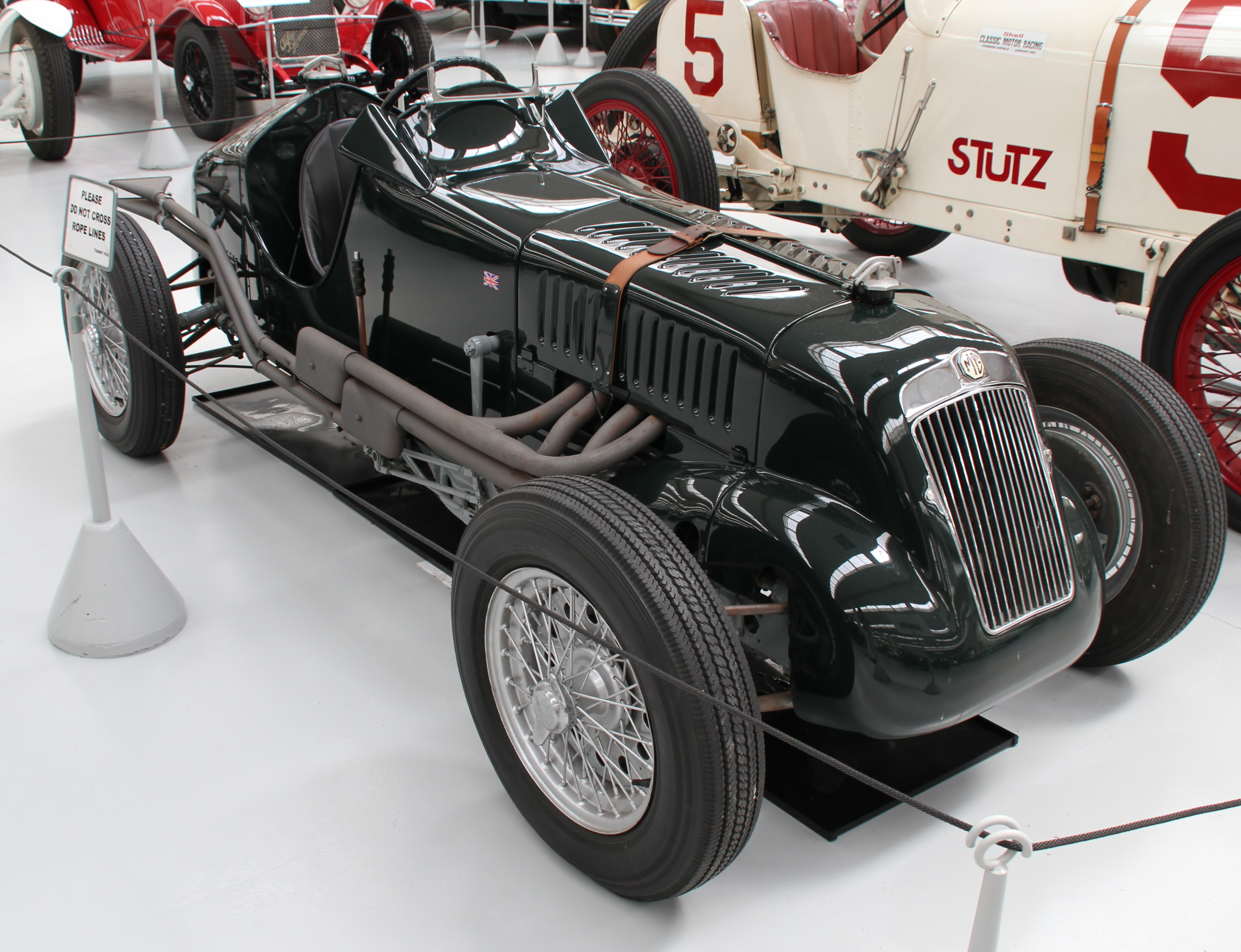

Overview
- Manufacturer: MG (Morris Motors)
- Production: 1935
- Assembly: Abingdon-on-Thames, Berkshire, England

Body and chassis
- Class: competition car
- Body style: single seat
- Layout: FR layout

Powertrain
- Engine: 746 cc supercharged I4

Dimensions
- Curb weight: 1400 pounds (620 kg)

Chronology
- Predecessor: MG Q-type

The MG R-type is a motor car that was produced by MG in 1935. It was designed for competition use and was a development of the Q-type.

The car used a tuned short-stroke (73 mm) version of the bevel-gear driven overhead camshaft engine from the 1928 Morris Minor and Wolseley 10. This had already been highly tuned for use in the Q-type and was further modified, especially in the input area, to improve reliability. It was fitted with a Zoller supercharger and produced 110 bhp (82 kW) at 7200 rpm. The gearbox was a four-speed preselector type unit. At the rear the differential in its aluminium casing was fastened to the chassis and drove the wheels through short shafts with sliding splines and universal joints.

The revolutionary Y-shaped steel chassis had a backbone that divided around the engine and gearbox, and was very light. The suspension was independent all round, making a first for MG and possibly the British motor industry, and used wishbones and longitudinal torsion bars allowing a large amount of wheel travel to allow for the poor surfaces on many of the contemporary racing circuits, especially Brooklands. Lever arm hydraulic shock absorbers were used. The brakes were cable-operated using 12-inch (305 mm) drums and the wheels were wire spoked and secured by a centre lock nut.

The aluminium single-seat body had the appearance of a miniature Grand Prix racer, and was designed to be easily removable.

The car was offered to the public at £750 and the initial ten were sold to pre-selected customers. A further batch was planned but never happened. A car changed hands at auction in 2006 for £130,000.

The first major sporting outing was to Brooklands for the International Trophy where a six-car team including three works entries appeared, but the best result was a 6th place and none of the works cars finished. It was realised that the suspension was giving problems, mainly with the rear being too soft, and solutions were proposed but all work stopped when new boss Leonard Lord closed the MG Racing Department. Private entries to competition continued and the works cars were sold to the Evans family who already owned one of the other cars.
