= 1960 Bathurst 100 =

Australian motor race meeting

Layout of the Mount Panorama Circuit (1938-1986)

The 1960 Bathurst 100 was a motor race staged at the Mount Panorama Circuit near Bathurst in New South Wales, Australia on 18 April 1960. It was contested over 26 laps, a total distance of approximately 100 miles. The race, which was promoted by the Australian Racing Drivers Club Ltd., was Round 2 of the 1960 Australian Drivers' Championship.

The race was won by Alec Mildren driving a Cooper T51 Maserati.

== Results ==
Pos	No	Entrant	Driver	Car	Race Time/DNF	Laps
1	2	A.G. Mildren Pty Ltd	Alec Mildren	Cooper T51 Maserati	1:11:38.6	26
2	7	Capitol Motors Pty Ltd	Arnold Glass	Maserati 250F	1:13:00.6	26
3	9	Bill Patterson Motors	Bill Patterson	Cooper T51 Climax	1:13:05.3	26
4	71	Ecurie Hall	Noel Hall	Cooper T51 Climax	1:11:45.3	25
5	10	J.B. Roxburgh	John Roxburgh	Cooper T45 Climax	1:11:46.4	25
6	60	Austin Miller	Austin Miller	Cooper T51 Climax	1:11:57.1	25
7	3	Jack Myers	Jack Myers	WM-Cooper T20 Holden	1:11:51.2	24
8	114	Scuderia Birchwood	Jon Leighton	Cooper T45 Climax	1:12:35.5	24
9	28	A.C. Rose	Alwyn Rose	Dalro Jaguar	1:12:43.1	23
10	15	Barry Collerson	Barry Collerson	Talbot-Lago T26C	1:12:24.1	22
11	12	P.D. Bloom	Philip Bloom	Dixon Riley Special	1:13:12.4	22
12	40	N.F. Barnes	Noel Barnes	MG TC Special	1:14:02.2	22
13	48	Bill Cooke	Bill Cooke	Riley-Peugeot Special	1:12:11.3	21
DNF	81	Bayldon & Stafford Car Sales	Bruce Maher	MG TD Special	Retired	14
DNF	13	Diablo Motors	Merv Ward	Diablo-Holden 6 Special	Retired	13
DNF	20	G.A. Scott	Glyn Scott	Cooper T43 Climax	Retired	11
DNF	56	R. Orlando	Bill Reynolds	Orlando MG Special Holden	Retired	10
DNF	132	Ecurie Lismore	Max Williams	MG TC Special	Retired	8
DNF	6	B.S. Stillwell	Bib Stillwell	Cooper T51 Climax	Accident	7
DNF	90	Ross Dalton	Ross Dalton	Jaguar C-Type	Retired	7
DNF	30	Diablo Motors	Reg Mulligan	HWM F2-51 Jaguar	Retired	3
DNF	11	Ecurie Cinque	Gordon Stewart	MG Stewart Special	Retired	3
DNF	88	Alex Strachan	Alex Strachan	Lotus Mark VI Climax	Retired	1
DNS	32	Keith Moy	Keith Moy	MG NE Magnette Holden	N/A	-
DNS	37	D.K. Russell	Keith Russell	MG TC Special	N/A	-
DNS	26	R.W Pentecost	Ross Pentecost	Nota FJ AJS	N/A	-
DNS	89	Nota Engineering	Guy Buckingham	Nota FJ BMC	N/A	-

- DNF = Did not finish
- DNS = Did Not Start
