= 1955 Bathurst 100 =

The 1955 Bathurst 100 was a motor race held at the Mount Panorama Circuit near Bathurst in New South Wales, Australia on Monday, 11 April 1955. It was contested on a handicap basis with the first car, the MG TC Special of Jack Carter starting 13 minutes before the last car, the Maserati of Reg Hunt.

The race was won on handicap by Curly Brydon driving an MG Special. Reg Hunt driving a Maserati set the fastest race time, thus winning the Scratch section.

== Race classification ==
| Position | Driver | No. | Car | Entrant | Handicap | Handicap race time | Laps | Scratch Pos. | Scratch race time |
| 1 | Curly Brydon | 9 | MG Special | A. Brydon | 5m 12s | 88m 12s | | 4 | 83m 00s |
| 2 | Lex Davison | 77 | HWM Jaguar | Ecurie Australie | 10m 24s | 89m 43s | | 3 | 79m 19s |
| 3 | Ern Seeliger | 2 | Cooper Bristol | S. Jones | 10m 50s | 89m 43s | | 2 | 78m 53s |
| 4 | Ray Fowler | 16 | MG Special | R. Fowler | 5m 12s | 90m 22s | | 6 | 85m 10s |
| 5 | Reg Hunt | 3 | Maserati | R. Hunt | 13m 00s | 90m 55s | | 1 | 77m 55s |
| 6 | Frank Walters | 41 | So-Cal V8 Special | F. Walters | 4m 20s | 91m 00s | | | |
| ? | Jack Masling | 5 | Jaguar XK120 Special | J. Masling | 9m 32s | | | 5 | 84m 43s |
| ? | Jack Carter | 34 | MG TC Special | J. Carter | 0m 00s | | | | |
| ? | Col James | 44 | MG Special | Barclay Motors | 5m 12s | | | | |
| ? | Don Wright | 20 | Citroen Special | D. Wright | ? | | | | |
| ? | John Ralston | 23 | MG Special | J. Ralston | 0m 52s | | | | |
| ? | John Boorman | 6 | Jaguar C-Type | J. Boorman | 9m 32s | | | | |
| ? | Bill Ford | 22 | RVM Riley | R. Evans | 3m 02s | | | | |
| ? | C. Dean | 11 | Cooper 1100 | S. Jones | 6m 30s | | | | |
| DNF | Gordon Greig, Tony Burke | 7 | Alfa Romeo Alvis | G. Grieg | 9m 32s | | | | |
| DNF | Les Murphy | 18 | MG Q s/c | L. Murphy | ? | | | | |
| DNF | Frank Tobin | 12 | Rizzo Riley | F. Tobin | 1m 18s | | 15 | | |
| DNF | Holt Binnie | 15 | MG Special s/c | H. Binnie | 5m 12s | | 15 | | |
| DNF | Austen Tauranac | 48 | Ralt | A. Tauranac | ? | | 11 | | |
| DNF | Bill Binning | 49 | MG Special | Dulwich Auto Sales | 0m 52s | | 4 | | |
| DNS | Stan Jones | 1 | Maybach | S. Jones | 13m 00s | | | | |

As there are known to have been 25 starters, the above listing is incomplete.

=== Notes ===
- Promoter: Australian Racing Drivers Club Ltd.
- Attendance: 35,000
- Number of starters: 25
- Number of finishers: Unknown
- Winner's average speed: 72.7 mph
- Fastest time: Reg Hunt, 77 minutes 55 seconds
