= 1962 Bathurst 100 =

Layout of the Mount Panorama Circuit (1938-1986)

The 1962 Craven Filter Bathurst 100 was a motor race staged at the Mount Panorama Circuit near Bathurst in New South Wales, Australia on 23 April 1962. The race was contested over 26 laps at a total distance of approximately 100 miles and it was Round 2 of the 1962 Australian Drivers' Championship.

The race was won by Bib Stillwell driving a Cooper T53 Climax.

== Results ==
Pos	No	Entrant	Driver	Car	Race Time/DNF	Laps
1	6	B.S. Stillwell	Bib Stillwell	Cooper T53 Climax	1:06:14.3	26
2	10	Scuderia Veloce	David McKay	Cooper T53 Climax	1:06:19.9	26
3	9	Bill Patterson Motors	Bill Patterson	Cooper T51 Climax	1:06:20.1	26
4	1	Scuderia Veloce	Greg Cusack	Cooper T51 Climax	1:06:44.8	24
5	28	A.C. Rose	Alwyn Rose	DalRo FLII Jaguar	1:07:49.2	22
6	4	Ecurie Australie	Lex Davison	Cooper T53 Climax	1:06:34.6	15
7	22	Ross Dalton	Ross Dalton	Cooper T51 Maserati	Overheating	8
8	71	Woolgoolga Motors	Noel Hall	Rennmax- Climax	Engine	3
9	7	Capitol Motors	Arnold Glass	BRM P48	Suspension	2
10	87	Frank Matich	Frank Matich	Lotus 19B Climax	Suspension	2
DNS	16	Geary's Sports Cars	John Hough	Cooper T51 Maserati	N/A	-
DNS	44	Ecurie Australie	Lex Davison	Aston Martin DBR4/300	Withdrew	-
