= 1964 Craven Filter Mount Panorama 1500 =

Layout of the Mount Panorama Circuit (1938-1986)

The 1964 Craven Filter Mount Panorama '1500' was a motor race staged at the Mount Panorama Circuit near Bathurst in New South Wales, Australia on 30 March 1964. The race was contested over 13 laps at a total distance of approximately 50 miles.

The race was won by Leo Geoghegan driving a Lotus 27 Ford.

== Results ==
Pos	No	Entrant	Driver	Car	Race Time/DNF	Laps
1	5	Total Team	Leo Geoghegan	Lotus 27 Ford	33:37.1	13
2	7	Capitol Motors	Arnold Glass	Lotus 27 Ford	33:50.1	13
3	10	Scuderia Veloce	Greg Cusack	Brabham BT6 Ford	33:59.4	13
4	20	Glyn Scott Motors	Glyn Scott	Lotus 27 Ford	35:09.3	13
5	43	Ken Milburn	Ken Milburn	Lotus 20 Ford	35:54.3	13
6	81	Kingsley Hibbard	Kingsley Hibbard	Rennmax BN1 Ford	33:12.4	12
7	22	Rex Flowers	Rex Flowers	Lotus 20 Ford	33:38.0	12
8	60	D.J. Kelley	Doug Kelley	Cooper T41 Climax	33:42.9	12
9	6	C.G. Smith	Ralph Sach	Elfin Junior Ford	34:19.4	12
10	137	JWF Glass Fibre Industries	Barry Collerson	Cooper T41 Climax	34:30.4	12
11	18	Salter Motors	Bob Salter	Lotus 20 Ford	35:18.7	12
12	92	Barry Lake	Barry Lake	Jolus FI Minx	33:07.1	11
13	11	Ecurie Cinque	Gordon Stewart	Stewart FJ MG	34:08.9	11
14	2	Alec Mildren Racing	Charlie Smith	Brabham BT6 Ford	Accident	11
15	57	Apex Autos	John Gates	Elfin Junior Climax	Retired	9
16	25	Ric Price	Ric Price	Lotus 18 Ford	Retired	7
17	50	Kurt Keller Motors	Kurt Keller	Lotus 20B Ford	Retired	6
18	8	Total Team	Ian Geoghegan	Lotus 22 Ford	Spun	4
19	49	Kurt Keller Motors	Allan Felton	Lotus 20 Ford	Retired	2
20	13	Killara Motor Garage	Bob Holden	Lynx F63 Peugeot	Retired	1
DNS	111	Motor Racing Components	Lionel Ayers	MRC-Lotus 22 Ford	N/A	-
DNS	64	R. MacKenzie	R. MacKenzie	Nota FJ Ford	N/A	-
DNS	40	A.J. Reynolds	A. Reynolds	Rennmax BN1 Ford	N/A	-
DNS	23	Bass Hill Service Station	K. Malcolm	Lotus 20 Ford	N/A	-
