= Norton International =

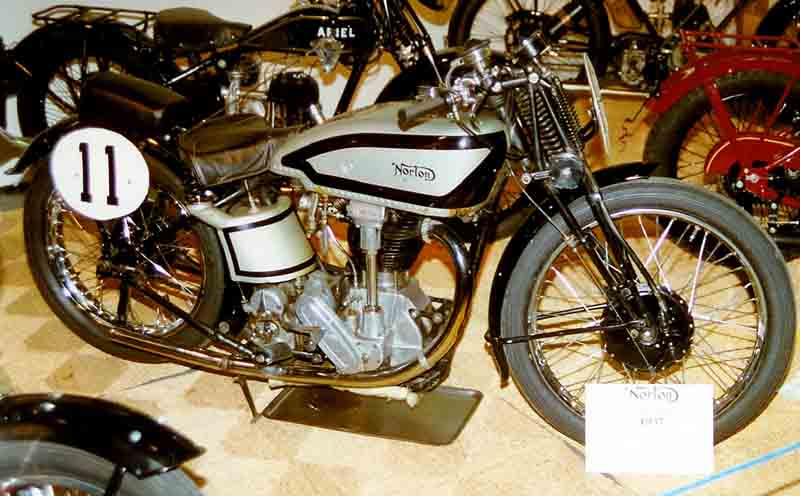
- Manufacturer: Norton Motorcycles
- Also called: Norton Inter, Cammy Norton, Model 30, Model 40
- Production: 1931–1939, 1947–1958 (Model 30 & Model 40)
- Engine: 490 cc (30 cu in) / 349 cc (21.3 cu in) single overhead cam air-cooled
- Bore / stroke: 79 mm × 100 mm (3.1 in × 3.9 in); 71 mm × 88 mm (2.8 in × 3.5 in)
- Top speed: 93 mph (150 km/h)
- Power: 29 bhp (22 kW)
- Transmission: Four speed, chain final drive
- Brakes: Drum
- Wheelbase: 54.75 in (1,391 mm)

The Norton International or Cammy Norton is a Norton Motors Ltd overhead cam (OHC) motorcycle built between 1931 and 1957.

More than a TT replica sports roadster, the OHC Model 30, was 500 cc and the OHC Model 40 was 350 cc. During the 1930s it could be ordered from the Norton factory with all manner of racing parts fitted. Such factory bikes won many Isle of Man TT races during the 1930s, many of them 1-2-3 results.

Norton factory riders on Inters, including Jimmie Guthrie, Jimmy Simpson, Stanley Woods were household names of the era. Production of the Model 30 and 40 International ended temporarily on the outbreak of World War II.

Production of the Inter resumed for 1947, and continued until 1957. Although the engine continued almost from first to last unchanged, the famed featherbed frame was adopted for the 1953 models. By the 1950s though, the model was outdated and outclassed by the new twins and shared only the featherbed frame with its postwar Manx racing cousins, and only sold in small numbers. In the final years the Inter was not even mentioned in the catalog and was available only to special order.

== Development ==
The name International was first used by Norton both for its newly designed race bikes and also for the TT replica sports roadster in 1932. Overseen by Joe Craig, Arthur Carroll had designed an overhead-camshaft engine for the works racers and although it retained the 79 mm × 100 mm (3.1 in × 3.9 in) bore and stroke of the Norton CS1, the Model 30 International was all new. The racing heritage led to quickly detachable wheels and hairpin type valve springs that could be changed rapidly when racing. In 1933, the forks and gearbox were redesigned and in 1935, the Sturmey-Archer gearbox was replaced, as Sturmey-Archer had stopped making gearboxes, so Norton bought the rights to the design and commissioned Burman to produce them. These gearboxes proved so good they remained unchanged for the next 30 years, although the external appearance was altered several times, and the gearchange mechanism fully enclosed and thus lubricated.

In 1936, the engine was upgraded with an alloy head and barrel with a bronze liner, available as an option. In 1938 suspension was upgraded to plunger type. And telescopic Roadholder Forks as ridden by Harrold Dannels and Freddie Frith in this year 1938 also available as an option. Production of the Model 30 and 40 ended on the outbreak of World War II. After the war, production of the International Model 30 (500 cc) and Model 40 (350 cc) restarted with an iron head and barrel, as fitted to the pre-war CS1 and CJ Nortons. The suspension was upgraded to Norton Roadholder telescopic forks instead of girders and Clubmans versions were also produced without silencers and lights for racing use. Close ratios gearboxes were supplied as standard from 1947, and the all alloy engine made a comeback in 1950. A new Featherbed framewas introduced in 1953 Volume production of the International ended in 1955, although small numbers were built to special order for two or three years after.

== World record ==
In 1935 works Norton team rider Jimmie Guthrie set a number of world speed records on a Norton International at the concrete bowl track in Montlhery, France. As well as setting a new one-hour world record at a speed of 114.09 miles per hour (183.61 km/h), he also broke the 50 km (31 mi), 50 mi (80 km), 100 km (62 mi) and 100 mi (160 km) records.

== Military use ==
Military police from the Provost Company of the Territorial Army's 1st London Division, commanded by Captain Sir Malcolm Campbell, were equipped with the Model 30 in 1940 for fast escort and traffic control in the Coats Mission to evacuate King George VI, Queen Elizabeth and their immediate family in the event of German invasion.

== George Formby's Norton International ==
A Norton International owned by comedian George Formby sold for £30,582 at an auction on 3 December 2007. The 1947 Norton International was one of several motorcycles owned by Formby, who starred in the film No Limits, a spoof of the 1935 Isle of Man TT race. The International was presented to Formby during a visit to Norton's Bracebridge Street factory in July 1947.

== Featherbed Norton Internationals in the 1950s ==
For 1951, the by-now outdated and heavy plunger frames on the Internationals were upgraded with Nortons new race proven Featherbed frame. The engine stayed essentially the same, although the lightweight alloy head and cylinder were fitted as standard (previously a no-cost option), and the gearbox was the laydown version (same gears in a revised housing).

Although Nortons advertising slogan of the time was "Built in the light of experience. Norton. The Worlds Best Roadholder" the new featherbed Inter was well behind the specification of the racing Norton Manx – double overhead cams and 8-inch twin leading shoe front brake. Also, the BSA Gold Star was proving formidable opposition in the Clubman Racing scene, so popular in the 1950s. So sales of the 1950s Norton International were somewhat muted, and by the mid-1950s it had disappeared from the catalogue, available only to special order.

A final facelift for the 1957 and 1958 models was a cosmetic update to the full width alloy hub wheels, chrome plated tank sidepanels, new type Lucas headlamp and tubular exhaust. Only a dozen or less of these final models are reputed to have been produced.
