= 1967 New South Wales Road Racing Championship =

Layout of the Mount Panorama Circuit (1938-1986)

The 1967 New South Wales Road Racing Championship was a motor race staged at the Mount Panorama Circuit near Bathurst in New South Wales, Australia on 27 March 1967. The race was contested over 13 laps at a total distance of approximately 50 miles.

The race was won by Kevin Bartlett driving a Brabham BT11A Climax.

== Results ==
| Pos | No | Entrant | Driver | Car | Race Time/DNF | Laps |
|---|---|---|---|---|---|---|
| 1 | 8 | Alec Mildren Racing | Kevin Bartlett | Brabham BT11A Climax | 30:31.3 | 13 |
| 2 | 44 | Max Stewart Motors | Max Stewart | Rennmax BN2 Ford | 31:39.1 | 12 |
| 3 | 12 | Phil West | Phil West | Brabham BT2 Ford | 32:04.8 | 12 |
| 4 | 9 | Advanx Gosford Motor Service | Alton Boddenberg | Lotus 32 Ford | 32:06.8 | 12 |
| 5 | 92 | Barry Lake | Barry Lake | Elfin Mono MkIIB Ford | 31:31.9 | 11 |
| 6 | 96 | BP Top Ryde Service Station | Paul Cohen | Jolus FI Minx | 31:54.9 | 3 |
| 7 | 1 | Bob Jane Racing Team | Spencer Martin | Brabham BT11A Climax | Oil Pressure | 5 |
| 8 | 55 | Colin Bond | Colin Bond | Lynx F63 Peugeot | Engine | 2 |
| DNS | 7 | Scuderia Veloce | Greg Cusack | Brabham BT23A Repco | Fuel Meter | - |
| DNS | 15 | Ian Fergusson | Ian Fergusson | Lotus 27 Ford | N/A | - |
| DNS | 24 | Alex Lazich | Alex Lazich | Piranha 67 Ford | N/A | - |
| DNS | 150 | Bill Bartrop | Bill Bartrop | Lynx F64 Ford | N/A | - |
