= 1960 Craven A International =

Layout of the Mount Panorama Circuit (1938-1986)

The 1960 Craven A International was a motor race staged at the Mount Panorama Circuit, Bathurst, New South Wales, Australia on 2 October 1960. It was the second 100-mile race for Formula Libre cars to be held at Bathurst in 1960, but unlike the Bathurst 100 held in April, the Craven A International was not a "Gold Star" race counting towards the 1960 Australian Drivers' Championship.

The race was won by Jack Brabham driving a Cooper T51 Coventry Climax.

== Race results ==
Position	Driver	No.	Car	Entrant	Class	Class pos.	Laps
1	Jack Brabham	1	Cooper T51 Coventry Climax	Jack Brabham	2001 - 3000 cc	1	26
2	Bill Patterson	9	Cooper T51 Coventry Climax	Bill Patterson Motors	1501 - 2000 cc	1	26
3	Bib Stillwell	6	Cooper T51 Coventry Climax	BS Stillwell	2001 - 3000 cc	2	26
4	Jon Leighton	70	Cooper T45 Coventry Climax	Scuderia Birchwood	2001 - 3000 cc	3	25
5	Noel Hall	71	Cooper T51 Coventry Climax	Ecurie Hall	1501 - 2000 cc	2	25
6	Arnold Glass	7	Maserati 250F	Capitol Motors	2001 - 3000 cc	4	25
7	Alwyn Rose	28	Dalro Jaguar	AC Rose	Over 3000 cc	1	22
8	Noel Barnes	40	MG Special	NF Barnes	1101 - 1500 cc	1	21
9	Guy Buckingham	89	Nota FJ	Nota Engineering	751 - 1100 cc	1	17
DNF	Austin Miller	60	Cooper T51 Coventry Climax	Superior Cars (Coburg)	2001 - 3000 cc	-	?
DNF	Alec Mildren	2	Cooper T51 Maserati	AG Mildren Pty Ltd	2001 - 3000 cc	-	16
DNF	Max Wiliams	132	MG Special	M Williams	1101 - 1500 cc	-	11
DNF	Doug Kelley	72	Cooper T41 Coventry Climax	DJ Kelley	1101 - 1500 cc	-	?
DNF	Jack Myers	3	Dalro Reno	J Myers	751 - 1100 cc	-	?
DNF	Stan Jones	4	Cooper T51 Coventry Climax	Stan Jones Motors	2001 - 3000 cc	-	1
DNF	John Roxburgh	10	Cooper T45 Coventry Climax	JB Roxburgh	2001 - 3000 cc	-	0
DNF	John Youl	5	Cooper T51 Coventry Climax	JC Youl	2001 - 3000 cc	-	0
DNF	Peter Hill	83	Scorpion Vincent	P Hil	751 - 1100 cc	-	?
DNF	Rex Mulligan	30	HWM Jaguar	Diablo Motors	Over 3000 cc	-	?
DNF	Tom Sulman	94	Maserati 4CM	NB Wiltshire	1101 - 1500 cc	-	?
DNF	Geoff McClelland	67	Mac Vincent	GB Mclelland	751 - 1100 cc	-	?
DNF	Barrie Garner	64	Nota Major BMC	JB Garner	1101 - 1500 cc	-	?
DNF	Keith Russell	37	MG TC	DK Rusell	1101 - 1500 cc	-	?
DNF	Gordon Stewart	11	Stewart MG	Ecurie Cinque	1101 - 1500 cc	-	?
DNF	Merv Ward	13	Ralt 500	Ralt	0 - 750 cc	-	?
DNF	Bruce Powell	19	DPR Triumph	B Powell	751 - 1100 cc	-	?

=== Notes ===
- Pole Position: Jack Brabham, 2m 33.7s
- Starters: 26
- Finishers: 9
- Winner's race time: 1h 7m 37.5s
- Fastest Lap: Jack Brabham, 2m 30.4s (new record)
