= 1951 Redex 100 =

Australian motor race

Layout of the Mount Panorama Circuit (1938-1986)

The 1951 Redex 100 was a motor race staged at the Mount Panorama Circuit, Bathurst, New South Wales, Australia on 26 March 1951. Promoted by the Australian Sporting Car Club, it was held over 26 laps, a total distance of approximately 100 miles (161 km). The race was contested on a handicap basis with the first car starting 11 minutes and 30 seconds minutes before the last car. 25,000 people watched the day's racing.

Bathurst driver Warwick Pratley won the race driving the George Reed Monoskate Ford Special.

== Results ==
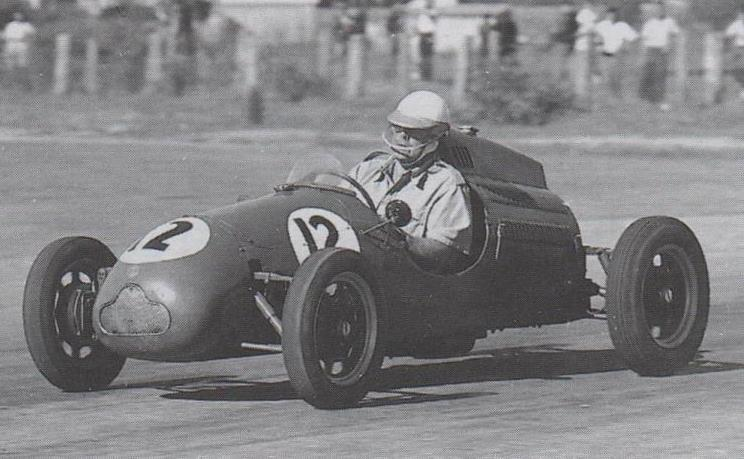
The Cooper Mark IV of Jack Saywell contesting the 1951 Redex 100

Position	Driver	No	Car	Entrant	Handicap	Race time
1	Warwick Pratley	22	G. Reed Special (Monoskate)	G.R Reed	8:15	80:21
2	Curley Brydon	25	MG TC special s/c	A.H. Brydon	9:15	84:27
3	Tom Hawkes	1	Talbot-Lago	T.V. Hawkes	0:00	76:19
NC	Ron Edgerton	2	Alfa Romeo s/c	R.M. Edgerton	3:15	-
NC	Bill Wilcox	45	Dodge special	W.H. Wilcox	10:15	-
NC	Jack Saywell	12	Cooper Mark IV	J. Saywell	5:00	-
NC	Garry Coglan	26	MG TC special s/c	G. Coglan	9:15	-
DNF	Bill MacLachlan	16	Bugatti Ford s/c	D.A. MacLachlan	6:00	-
DNF	Jack Murray	29	Allard J2 Cadillac	R.A. Gardiner	9:15	-
DNF	Laurie Oxenford	34	Alvis Mercury	I. Oxenford	9:15	-
DNF	George Pearse	47	MG TB s/c	G.E. Pearse	11:30	-

== Race statistics ==
- Starters: 11
- Finishers: 3 (within race time limit)
- Non-finishers: 8 (4 outside race time limit, 4 retirements)
