= 1958 Bathurst 100 =

Layout of the Mount Panorama Circuit (1938-1986)

The 1958 Bathurst 100 was a motor race staged at the Mount Panorama Circuit near Bathurst in New South Wales, Australia on 7 April 1958. It was contested over 26 laps, a distance of approximately 100 miles. The race was promoted by the Australian Racing Drivers Club Ltd.

The race was won by Doug Whiteford driving a Maserati 300S.

== Results ==
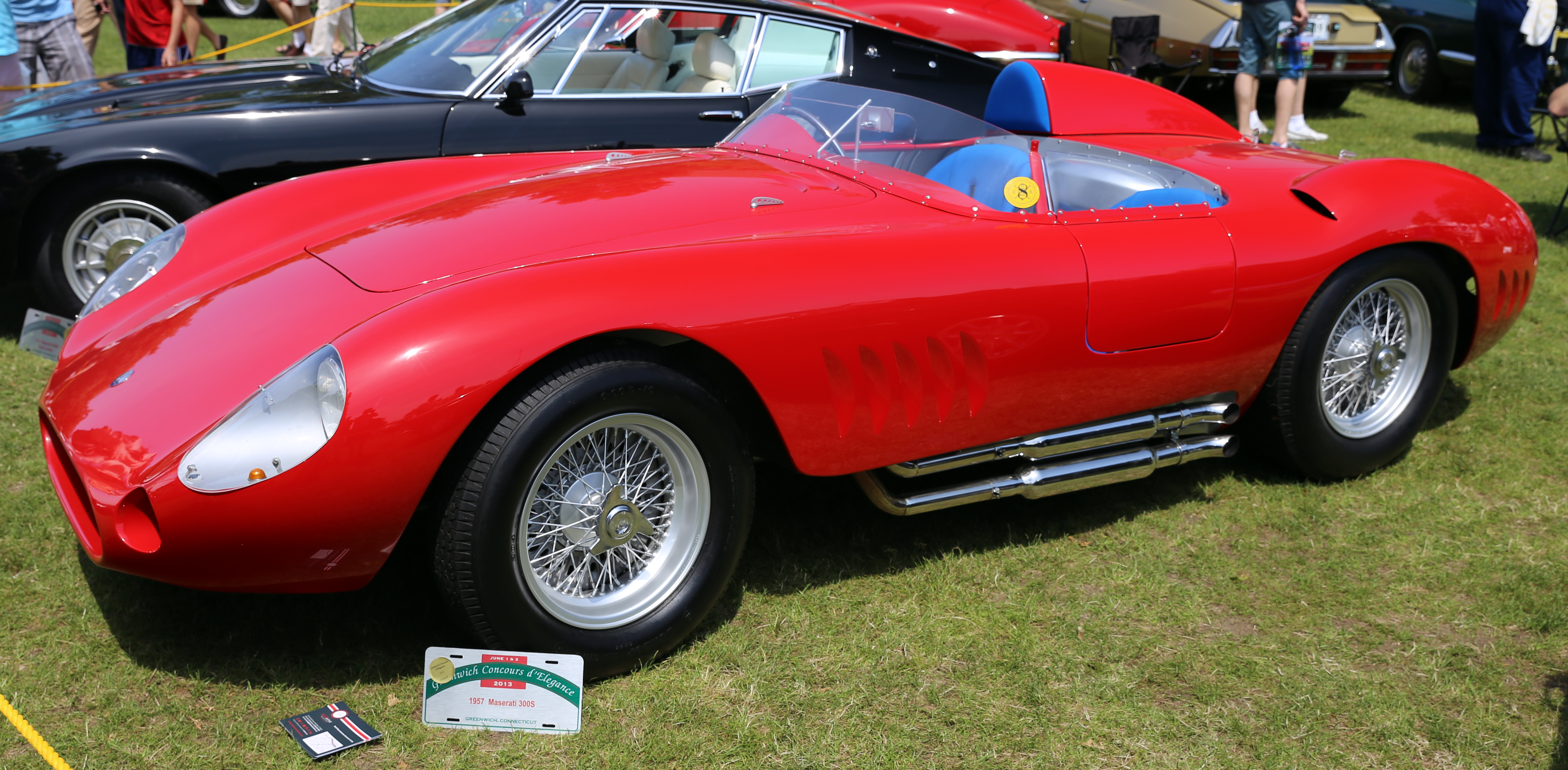
Doug Whiteford won the race driving a Maserati 300S similar to the example pictured above.

Position	Driver	No.	Car	Entrant	Laps	Time / Remarks
1	Doug Whiteford	24	Maserati 300S	D. Whiteford	26	76:53.5
2	Arnold Glass	2	Ferrari 555	Capitol Motors	26	77:18.1
3	Bill Pitt	4	Jaguar D-Type	Mrs. G. Anderson	26	78:07.4
4	Merv Neil	7	Cooper T43 Coventry Climax	Merv Neil	26	78:28.2
5	Chas Whatmore	27	Lotus 11	Chas Whatmore's Sports Center	26	80:10.5
6	Alec Mildren	10	Cooper T43 Coventry Climax	A. Mildren	26	81:28.0
7	Bill Ford	56	Orlando MG	Robin Orlando	25	81.22.5
8	Allan Ferguson	45	MG Holden	A. Ferguson	22	70:23.0
9	Clive Adams	8	Prad Holden	C. Adams	21	70:23.0
10	Gordon Stewart	11	Stewart MG	Ecurie Cinque	20	69:40.6
11	Noel Barnes	40	MG special	N. Barnes	20	82:55.5
12	Glyn Scott	20	Holden Special	G. Scott	20	63:40.0
?	Frank Walters	41	SoCal V8 Special	F. B. Walters	?	
DNF	Ern Seeliger	1	Maybach 3 Chevrolet	E. Seeliger	?	
DNF	Lionel Ayers	117	MG TC	L. Ayers	?	
DNF	Ron Phillips	12	Cooper Jaguar	R. Phillips	12	
DNF	Curly Brydon	9	Ferrari 166	A.H. Brydon	12	
DNF	Paul Samuels	17	MG special	Moss Bros. Retreads	10	
DNF	Bill March	49	Holden special	H. Podmore	10	
DNF	Jesse Griffiths	36	Maserati 4CL	J. Griffiths	7	
DNF	George Websdale	81	Buchanan MG	G. L. Websdale	7	
DNF	Len Lukey	44	Cooper T23 Bristol	L. Lukey	6	
DNF	Ray Walmsley	19	Alfa Romeo GMC	R. Walmsley	6	
DNF	Ern Tadgell	5	Sabakat Coventry Climax	C.E. Tadgell	3	
DNF	Vince Profilio	34	MG special	V. Profilio	?	Accident
DNS	Bib Stillwell	6	Cooper T43 Coventry Climax	B. Stillwell	-	Accident in preliminary race
DNS	Ross Jensen	18	Maserati 250F	R. Jensen	-	Engine failure

=== Notes ===
- Attendance: 26,000 (estimated)
- Starters: 25
