= 1961 New South Wales Road Racing Championship =

Motor Race Championship

Layout of the Mount Panorama Circuit (1938-1986)

The 1961 New South Wales Road Racing Championship was a motor race staged at the Mount Panorama Circuit near Bathurst in New South Wales, Australia on 1 October 1961. The race was contested over 13 laps at a total distance of approximately 50 miles.

The race was won by Noel Hall driving a Cooper T51 Climax.

== Results ==
Pos	No	Entrant	Driver	Car	Race Time/DNF	Laps
1	71	Ecurie Hall	Noel Hall	Cooper T51 Climax	34:53.4	13
2	20	G.A. Scott	Glyn Scott	Cooper T43 Climax	36:03.6	12
3	8	Geoghegan Motors	Leo Geoghegan	Lotus 20 Ford	37:58.5	12
4	11	Ecurie Cinque	Gordon Stewart	MG Stewart Special	34:58.7	11
5	78	Rawsthornes Garage	John Hough	HWM F2-51 Jaguar	35:07.0	11
6	40	N.F. Barnes	Noel Barnes	MG TC Special	35:12.7	11
7	43	Len Deaton	Len Deaton	Cooper T43 Ford	35:14.4	11
8	64	Barrie Garner	Barrie Garner	Nota Major BMC	36:55.6	11
9	81	Bayldon & Stafford Car Sales	Kevin Salmon	MG Special	37:57.6	11
10	6	B.S. Stillwell	Bib Stillwell	Cooper T51 Climax	Gearbox	12
11	34	Continental Cars	Bill Machin	BMC Spyder Special	Gearbox	6
12	28	A.C. Rose	Alwyn Rose	DalRo FLII Jaguar	Halfshaft	4
13	15	Barry Collerson	Barry Collerson	Talbot-Lago T26C	Retired	3
14	3	Jack Myers	Jack Myers	Cooper-Thunderbird MkIV Triumph	Halfshaft	0
