= 1963 Bathurst 100 =

Aussie motor racing

Layout of the Mount Panorama Circuit (1938-1986)

The 1963 Bathurst 100 was a motor race which was staged at the Mount Panorama Circuit, Bathurst, New South Wales, Australia on 15 April 1963. It was organised by the Australian Racing Drivers Club Ltd. The race was open to Racing Cars, Formula Junior cars and invited Sports Cars and was contested over a distance of 100 miles.

The race was won by Lex Davison driving a Cooper T62.

== Results ==
Pos.	Driver	No.	Car	Entrant	Class	Class pos.	Laps	Time	Comment	Grid Pos.
1	Lex Davison	4	Cooper T62 Coventry Climax	Ecurie Australie	Over 1500cc	1	26	66:05.0		1
2	Tony Shelly	3	Cooper T53 Coventry Climax	Ecurie Australie	Over 1500cc	2	24	66:14.1		3
3	Charlie Smith	6	Elfin Ford	C. G. Smith	Up to 1500cc	1		67:37.1		6
4	Doug Kelley	60	Cooper T41 Coventry Climax	D. J. Kelley	Up to 1500cc	2		68:52.6		9
?	Les Howard	15	Lotus 11 Coventry Climax	Howard & Sons Racing Team	Up to 1500cc	3		66:44.5		14
?	Greville Edgerton	45	Cooper T38 Jaguar	G. Edgerton	Over 1500cc	3		67:19.2		11
DNF	David McKay	1	Repco Brabham BT4 Coventry Climax	Scuderia Veloce	Over 1500cc	-	9		Overheating	2
DNF	Ralph Sach	34	Nota Din Holden	Reilly Brothers Engineering Pty. Ltd.	Over 1500cc	-	0		Head gasket	15
DNS	Frank Matich	87	Lotus 19 Coventry Climax		Over 1500cc	-	-			4
DNS	Bill Patterson	9	Cooper T53 Coventry Climax	Bill Patterson Motors Pty. Ltd.	Over 1500cc	-	-			5
DNS	Ian Geoghegan	8	Lotus 22 Ford	Total Team	Up to 1500cc	-	-			7
DNS	Lionel Ayers	111	Lotus 20 Ford	Motor Racing Components	Up to 1500cc	-	-			8
DNS	Tom Corcoran	2	Lola Mk 2 Ford s/c	T. Corcoran	Up to 1500cc	-	-			10
DNS	Barry Collerson	21	Jolus Hillman	J. McGuire	Up to 1500cc	-	-			12
DNS	Ken Milburn	23	Lotus 20 Ford	K. Milburn	Up to 1500cc	-	-			13
DNS	Gordon Stewart	11	Stewart MG s/c	Ecurie Cinque	Over 1500cc	-	-			16
