= 1956 Bathurst 100 =

Layout of the Mount Panorama Circuit (1938–1986)

The 1956 Bathurst 100 was a motor race held at the Mount Panorama Circuit, Bathurst, New South Wales, Australia on 2 April 1956. It was staged over 26 laps of the 3.875-mile circuit, a total distance of approximately 100 miles. The race was contested on a handicap basis with the first cars starting 16 minutes and two seconds before the last car, the Maserati 250F of Reg Hunt.

The race was won by Lex Davison in a Ferrari, with the Scratch section (disregarding handicaps) won by Reg Hunt driving a Maserati 250F.

== Race results ==
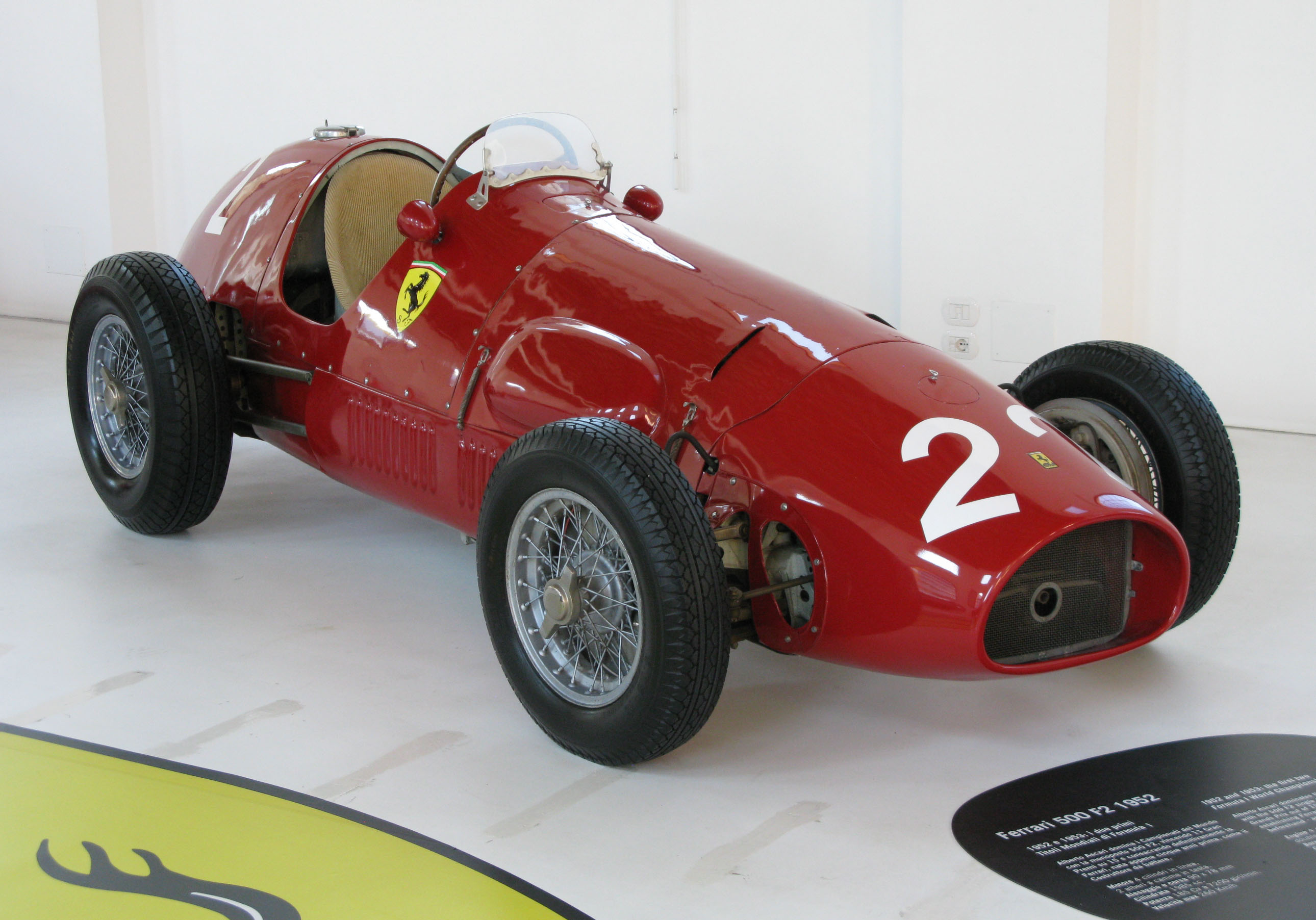
Lex Davison won the race driving a Ferrari 500 similar to the example pictured above

Position	Driver	No.	Car	Entrant	Laps	Handicap	Race time	Scratch result	Time
1	Lex Davison	2	Ferrari 500 3.0	Ecurie Australie	26	19:04	1:29:59	2	1:15:15
2	Reg Hunt	1	Maserati 250F	R Hunt		20:22	1:30:59	1	1:14:57
3	Bib Stillwell	3	Jaguar D-type	B Stillwell		?	1:32:37	3	1:19:11
4	Paul England	28	Ausca	P England		10:50	1:35:41		
5	Tom Griffiths	30	Triumph TR2	T Griffiths		5:12	1:36:38		
6	Jack Robinson	14	Jaguar Special	J Robinson		12:34	1:37:26		
7	Tom Sulman	9	Aston Martin DB3S	T Sulman		13:26	1:37:38	4	1:28:32
8	Bob Weintraub	92	Healey Silverstone	R Weintraub		6:30	1:40:11		
9	Clive Adams	8	HRG Holden	C Adams		10:50	1:40:19		
10	John Martin	111	MG Special	J Martin		6:30	1:42:51		
NC	Alex Strachan	90	Lotus 6 Coventry Climax FWA	A Strachan		?			
DNF	Col James	7	MG TC	C James		13:26			
DNF	Alec Mildren	10	Cooper Bristol	A Mildren	13?	13:00			
DNF	Les Wheeler	11	MG Special	L Wheeler	13?	8:40			
DNF	Noel Barnes	38	MG Special	N Barnes	13?	5:12			
DNF	Ray Warmsley	19	Alfa Romeo Alvis	R Walmsley		12:34			
DNF	Dick Bland	25	Dixon Riley	R Bland		8:40			
DNF	John Ralston	15	MG Special	R Daniel	11	4:20			
DNF	Merv Ward	13	Ralt 500	M Ward	7	4:20			
DNF	Harry Gapps	24	MG Special	H Gapps	4	5:38			
DNF	Holt Binnie	26	MG TD Special	Auto Services	1	4:20			

- Organiser: Australian Racing Drivers Club
- Starters: 21
