= Norton Manx =

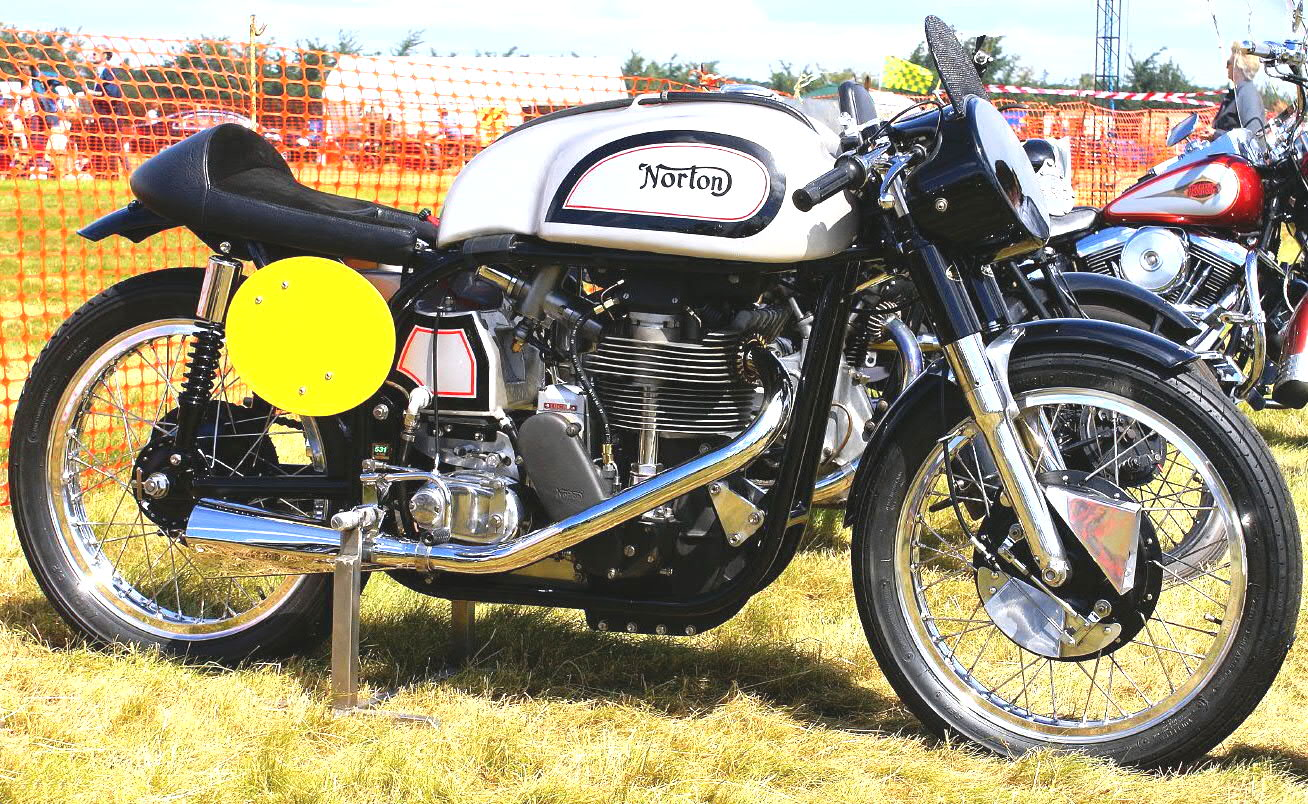
- Pre-1962 Norton Manx
- Manufacturer: Norton Motorcycles
- Also called: Norton 30M and 40M
- Production: 1946–1953 (long stroke) 1953–1962 (short stroke)
- Class: Road racing
- Engine: 499 cc (30.5 cu in) 2 valve DOHC air cooled single (Also in 348 cc (21.2 cu in))
- Bore / stroke: 1947: 79.62 mm × 100 mm (3.135 in × 3.937 in); 1953: 86.1 mm × 85.6 mm (3.39 in × 3.37 in)
- Top speed: 500 cc: 130 mph (210 km/h); 140 mph (230 km/h); 350 cc: 115 mph (185 km/h)
- Power: 500 cc: 47 bhp (35 kW) @ 6,500 rpm, 54 bhp (40 kW) @ 7,200 rpm, 52 bhp (39 kW) @ 6500 rpm 350 cc: 35 hp (26 kW)
- Transmission: Four speed, chain final drive
- Frame type: Steel, twin loop full cradle
- Suspension: Front: telescopic fork Rear: Swingarm
- Brakes: Drum
- Wheelbase: 56 inches (1,400 mm)
- Weight: 140 kg (310 lb) (dry)

The Norton Manx or Manx Norton is a British racing motorcycle that was made from 1947 to 1962 by Norton Motors Ltd. Norton had contested every Isle of Man TT race from the inaugural 1907 event through into the 1970s, a feat unrivalled by any other manufacturer, and the development and honing of the Manx racing motorcycle was another step in this racing achievement.

New Manx Nortons, built to various specifications are still available to buy new, from various suppliers around the world. These should not be confused with Norton production motorcycles even though they suit different categories and definitions of Classic Motorcycle Racing and Historic Motorcycle Racing in different countries around the world.

Norton's first use of the name 'Manx' was applied to the 'Manx Grand Prix' model available from 1936 to 1940, a special racing version of their 'International' roadster, with telescopic forks and a plunger rear suspension, magnesium for the crankcases and cambox, and no provision for lighting. Just after WW2, the 'Grand Prix' was dropped, and Norton named their 1947 racing model the 'Manx'. It was a lightly redesigned prewar racing Norton International, an overhead cam single-cylinder machine available as a 350cc or 500cc. The Norton factory race bikes under team manager Joe Craig were experimental models, and a version was available for sale from the factory in Bracebridge Street - to selected customers. Fitted with the McCandless brothers' Featherbed frame for 1950, the Manx gained a new lease of racing life as a racing machine, the new frame giving the fine steering necessary for high speed navigation of some very fast racing circuits of the time.

The last Bracebridge Street (the original home of Norton) Manx Nortons were sold in 1963. Even though Norton had pulled out of International Grand Prix racing in 1954, the Manx had become the backbone of privateer racing. The Classic Motorcycle Racing movement from the 1970s onwards has seen relatively large numbers of Manxs return to the track, and a flourishing supply of parts and services has appeared all around the world to nourish this demand.

== Development ==
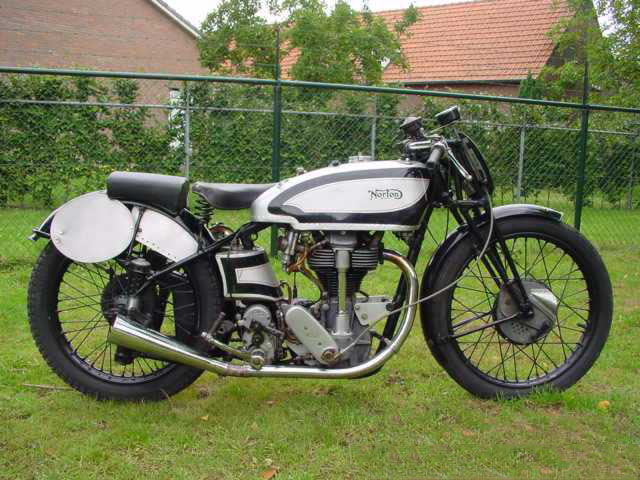
1937 Norton International - the Manx name didn't appear until after WW2

The Norton Manx was developed to win the Isle of Man TT from single overhead cam international racers by Norton racing team engineer Joe Craig. The double overhead cam configuration was developed in 1937 and after many problems perfected one year later. The Manx was delayed by the outbreak of World War II but reemerged for the 1946 Manx Grand Prix. The motorcycle was upgraded with new telescopic forks and in 1948 gained twin leading shoe brakes. In 1950 the innovative Featherbed frame was developed, giving the Manx a significant competitive advantage through a low centre of gravity and short wheelbase that was perfectly suited the challenging island TT course. The all-welded, tubular featherbed frame was light and trim, without the usual forgings that added unnecessary weight. In 1950, the featherbed Manx recorded a double hat-trick of podium positions at the TT. The Manx engine was redesigned in 1953 with a much shorter stroke of 86.0 mm × 85.6 mm (3.39 in × 3.37 in) to improve the rev range.

The major 1954 upgrade to the Manx was to have been an engine with the cylinder mounted horizontally to give a much lower centre of gravity – along the lines of the Moto Guzzi and Benelli racers. However, a decline in sales in the mid-1950s prompted a number of manufacturers to withdraw from GP racing in 1954, and Nortons did likewise. The Norton F Type Manx, as it was to have been, still exists, and restored is displayed in the Sammy Millers Museum Collection. With Nortons withdrawal from racing, Joe Craig retired after more than 25 years of coaxing ever more power and reliability from his single cylinder Cammy racers. The bike had several wins at the Bol d'Or from 1958 to 1971.

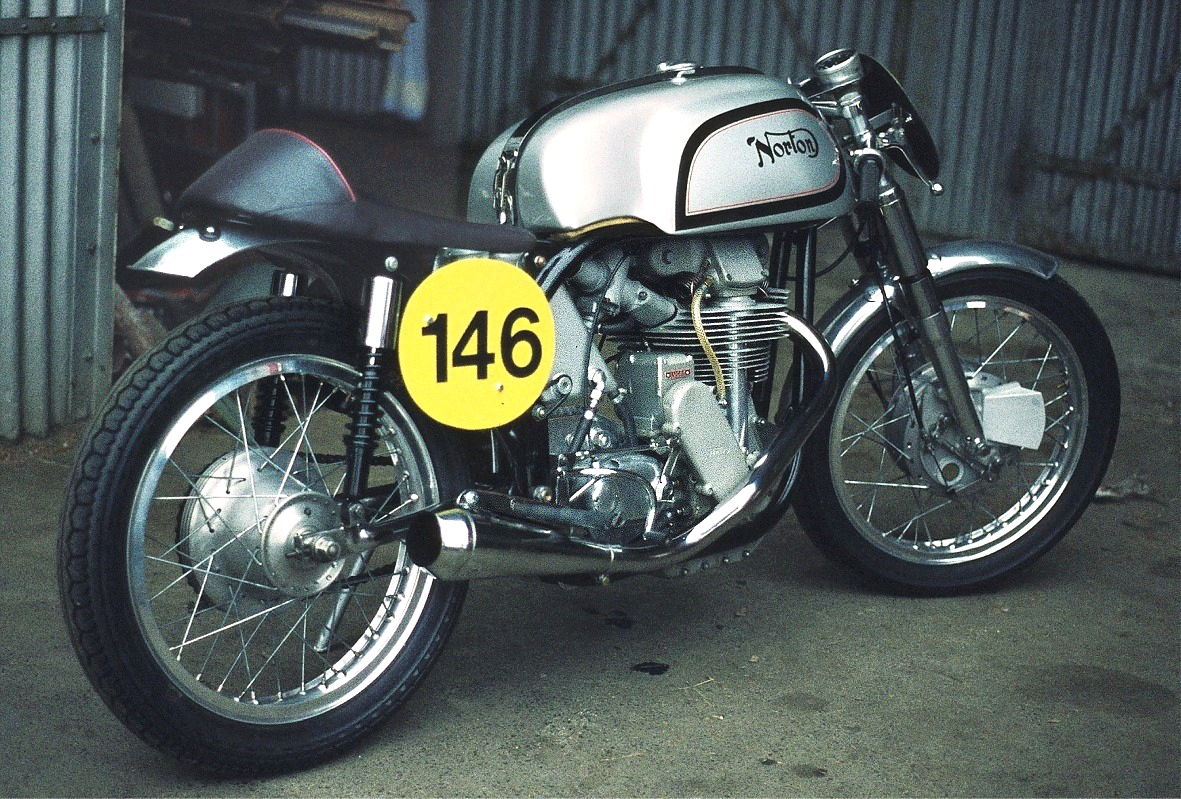
Norton Manx

== Les Archer Norton Manx MX ==
British racer Les Archer, Jr. worked with frame specialist Ron Hankins and engine tuner Ray Petty to develop a Norton Manx for motocross competition. The double-overhead-cam, short-stroke Norton Manx road racing engine was fitted into a Hankins frame and finished with an aluminium tank and titanium axles. His earlier Manx MX was successful, winning the 1956 F.I.M. 500 cc European Motocross Championship, but even the later updated 1962 machine was not able to compete with the emerging two-stroke bikes of the middle 1960s.

== Car racing ==
Manx Nortons also played a significant role in the development of post war car racing. At the end of 1950, the English national 500 cc regulations were adopted as the new Formula 3. The JAP Speedway engine had dominated the category initially but the Manx was capable of producing significantly more power and became the engine of choice. Many complete motorcycles were bought in order to strip the engine for 500 cc car racing, as Norton would not sell separate engines. Manx rolling chassis were frequently sold on and paired with Triumph twin engines to create Triton cafe racers.

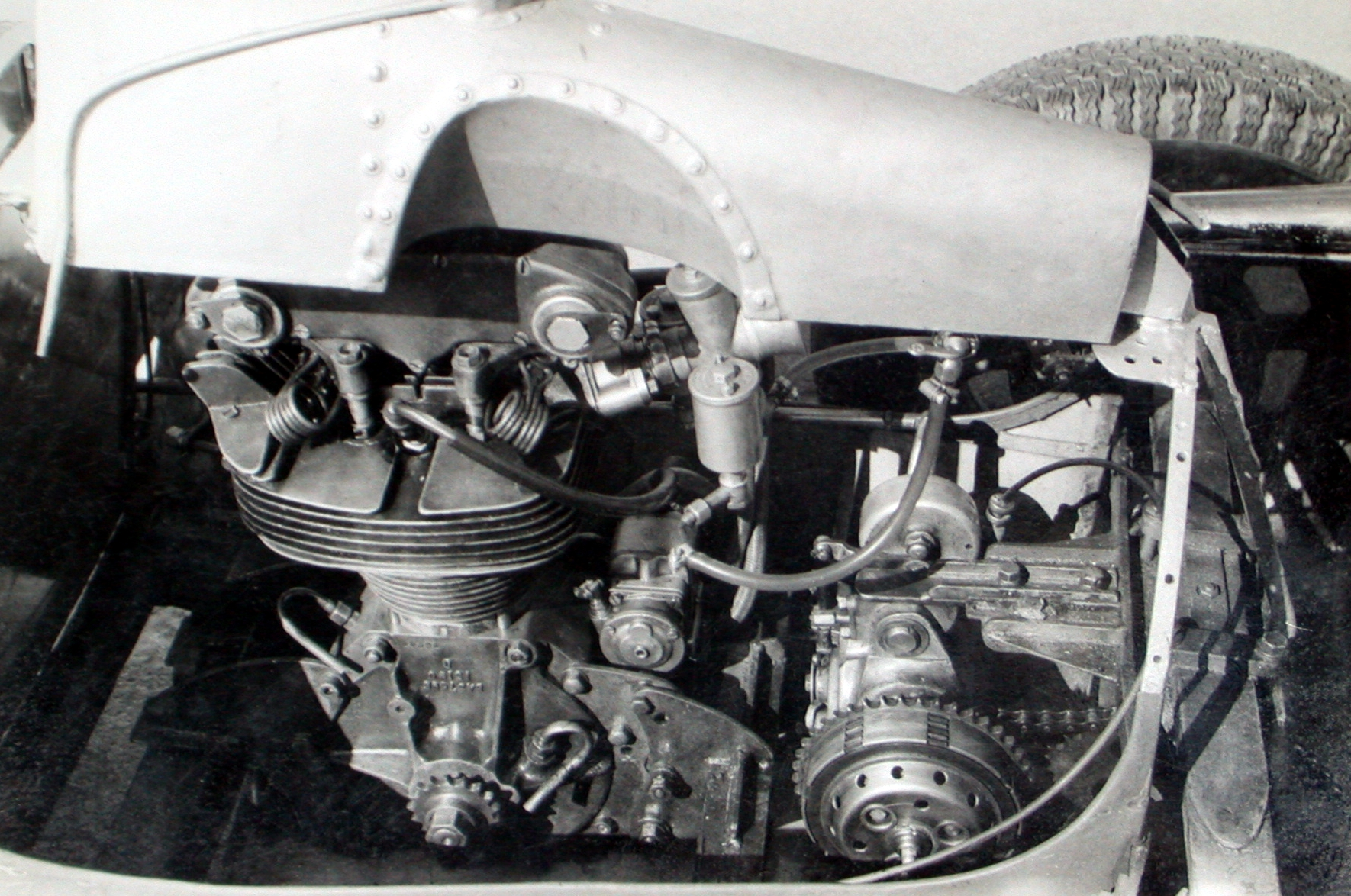
Norton Manx Engine in a Cooper race car

== Endings and beginnings ==
1962 was the last full year for the production Norton Manx. In July AMC announced the transfer of production from Bracebridge Street to Woolwich in London. Forty two Manx Nortons were produced between November 1962 and January 1963. In 1966 Colin Seeley purchased what remained of the spares and tools, which he eventually sold on to John Tickle in 1969. When Godfrey Nash rode a Norton Manx to victory at the 1969 Yugoslavian Grand Prix at the Opatija Circuit, it would mark the last time that a 500cc Grand Prix race was won on a single-cylinder machine.

John Tickle took over the Manx name when Norton ceased production and acquired a large quantity of spare parts. He also manufactured complete racers, called the Manx T5 (500) and T3 (350). Both used the short-stroke Manx engines in a frame designed by Tickle but he could not compete against the Japanese racers and sold his stock and the rights in the late 1970s to Unity Equipe, a retail spares business in Rochdale, UK. Bernie Allen of Wiltshire obtained the rights to manufacture the Manx in 1989 and manufacture a limited number of machines in 1992 and 1993 under the name Allen Norton.

The manufacturing rights then passed in 1994 to Andy Molnar, an engineer based in Preston, UK who firstly produced parts faithful to the original 1961 drawings, followed by engines then complete machines named Molnar Manx. A road-version with alternator and 'softer' engine spec is also available in conjunction with ex-racer Steve Tonkin, called Tonkin Tornado with a 2013 base-price of £34,000 (GBP).
