= MG Q-type =

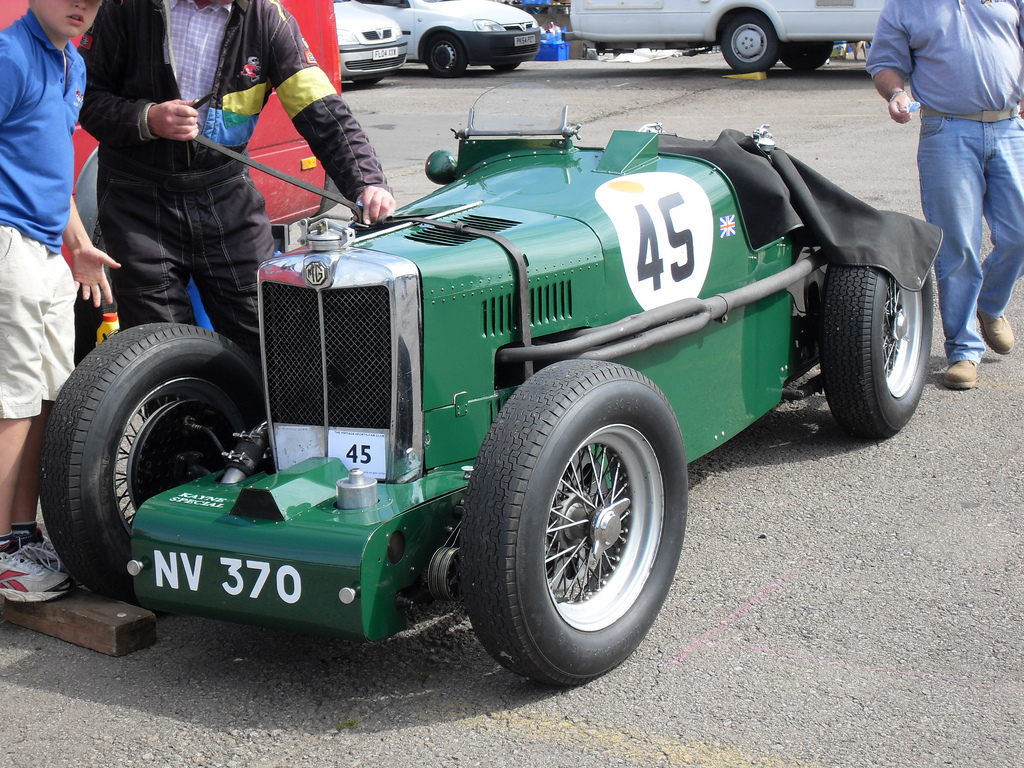

Overview
- Manufacturer: MG
- Production: 1934
- Assembly: Abingdon-on-Thames, Berkshire, England

Body and chassis
- Class: Racing car
- Body style: open single or two seat

Powertrain
- Engine: 746 cc four-cylinder, overhead cam, supercharged.
- Transmission: four-speed preselector

Dimensions
- Wheelbase: 94 in (2,388 mm)
- Length: 143 in (3,632 mm)
- Width: 53 in (1,346 mm)

Chronology
- Predecessor: none
- Successor: MG R-type

The MG Q-type (sometimes referred to as the MG QA) is a racing car that was produced by MG in 1934. The chassis was based on the one used on the MG K3 but was narrower and used N-type axles. The engine used the cylinder block from the P-type but with a special crankshaft to bring the capacity down to 746 cc by reducing the stroke from 83 mm (3.3 in) to 71 mm (2.8 in). A high-pressure Zoller supercharger was fitted giving a boost to 2.5 atmospheres (1.8 kg/cc) and allowing the engine to produce 113 bhp (84 kW) at 7200 rpm. A sprint version was also made with output increased to 146 bhp (109 kW) which at nearly 200 bhp (150 kW) per litre was the highest specific output of any engine in the world at the time

Probably only eight were made (Michael Sedgwick states nine) as the car was expensive at £550–£650, and the rigid-axle chassis had difficulty in dealing with the power of the engine. The single-seat version achieved a lap speed of 122 mph (196 km/h) at Brooklands race track driven by George Harvey-Noble, and the two-seater was capable of 120 mph (190 km/h).

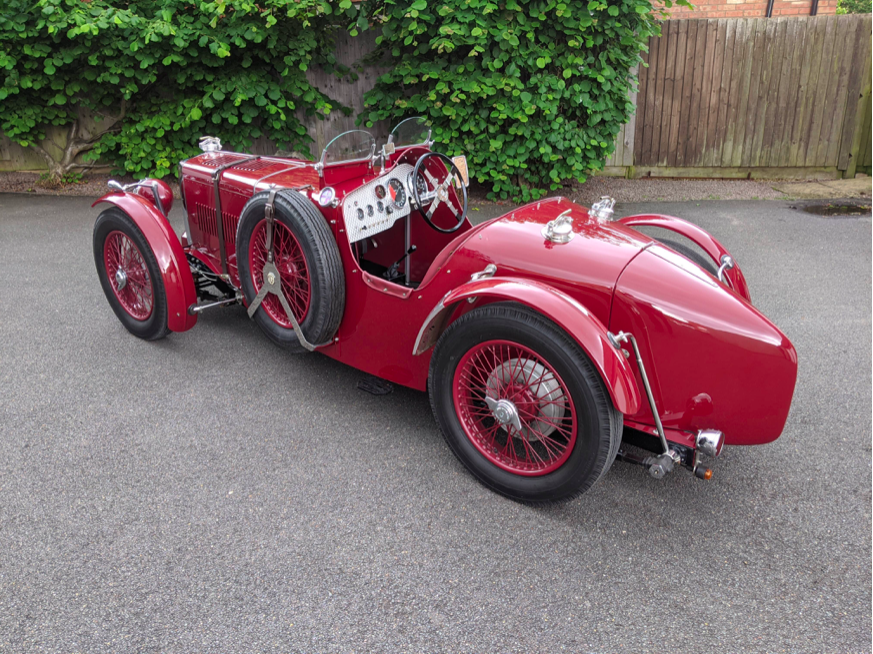
1937 MG TA/Q Special

Many "specials" have been built on T-type chassis to mimic the style of the Q-type body.
