= MG N-type =

MG N-Type "Magnette"
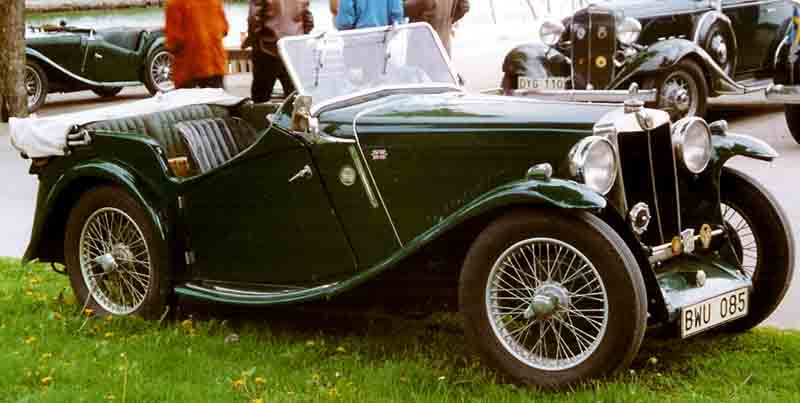
- 1934 MG NA Magnette

Overview
- Manufacturer: MG (Morris)
- Production: 1934–1936
- Assembly: Abingdon-on-Thames, Berkshire, England

Body and chassis
- Class: sports car
- Body style: 2- and 4-seat open tourer Foursome Coupé; 2-seat competition car

Powertrain
- Engine: 1271 cc In-line 6
- Transmission: 4-speed manual

Chronology
- Predecessor: MG L-type/MG K-type

The MG N-type (also known as the MG Magnette) is a sports car that was produced by MG from October 1934 to 1936. The car was developed from the K-Type and L-Type but had a new chassis that broke away in design from the simple ladder type used on the earlier cars of the 1930s being wider at the rear than the front and with the body fitted to outriggers off the main frame.

== NA ==
The engine was a further development of the 1271 cc 6-cylinder KD series overhead camshaft engine used in the K-type and originally used in the 1930 Wolseley Hornet. Modifications were made to the cylinder block and head and fitted with twin SU carburettor. It produced 56 bhp (42 kW) at 5500 rpm, a near 25% improvement. Drive was to the rear wheels through a four-speed non-synchromesh gearbox. The car had a wheelbase of 96 inches (2439 mm) and a track of 45 inches (1143 mm). Semi elliptic leaf springs, wider and longer than those used on previous cars, were fitted all round and the body was mounted to the chassis using rubber pads.

The factory-supplied body was new and taller than on earlier cars, the doors were rear hinged and featured cut-away tops. The slab type fuel tank at the rear which had featured on earlier models was no longer seen on the N-Type, being hidden in the tail. In addition to the solid colour factory options, also offered were two tone combinations. The darker colour was applied to the upper surfaces (bonnet, scuttle, rear deck and guards). As well as the open cars, an Airline Coupé model was also available but few were sold. Some cars were supplied in chassis form to outside coachbuilders including Allingham, (actually made by Carbodies) who made a 2/4-seater where the rear seats could be closed off by a removable deck to appear like a 2-seater, and Abbey.

== NB ==
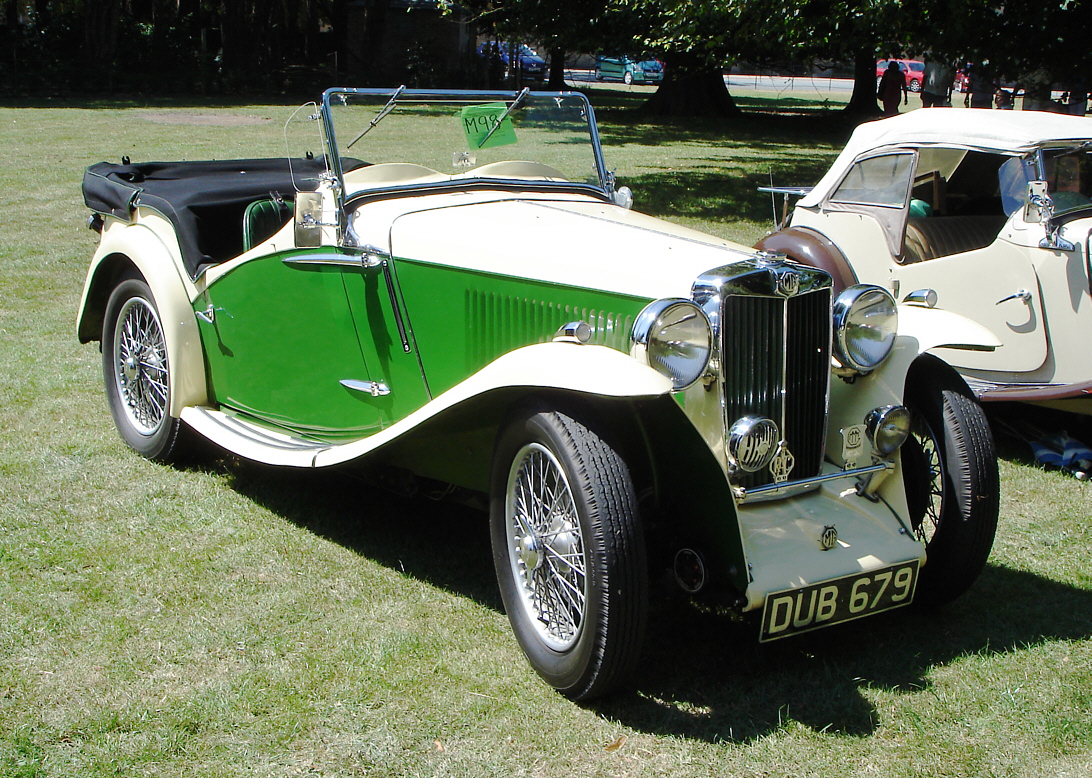
1935 MG NB Magnette

The NB, announced in 1935, had an updated body with lower lines and vertical slats on the radiator grille. The doors were now front hinged, better seats were fitted and the instruments re-arranged with the speedometer and tachometer now having separate dials. The factory supplied two tone color options were reversed, that is, the lighter color was on the upper surfaces. The Airline Coupé body was still available.

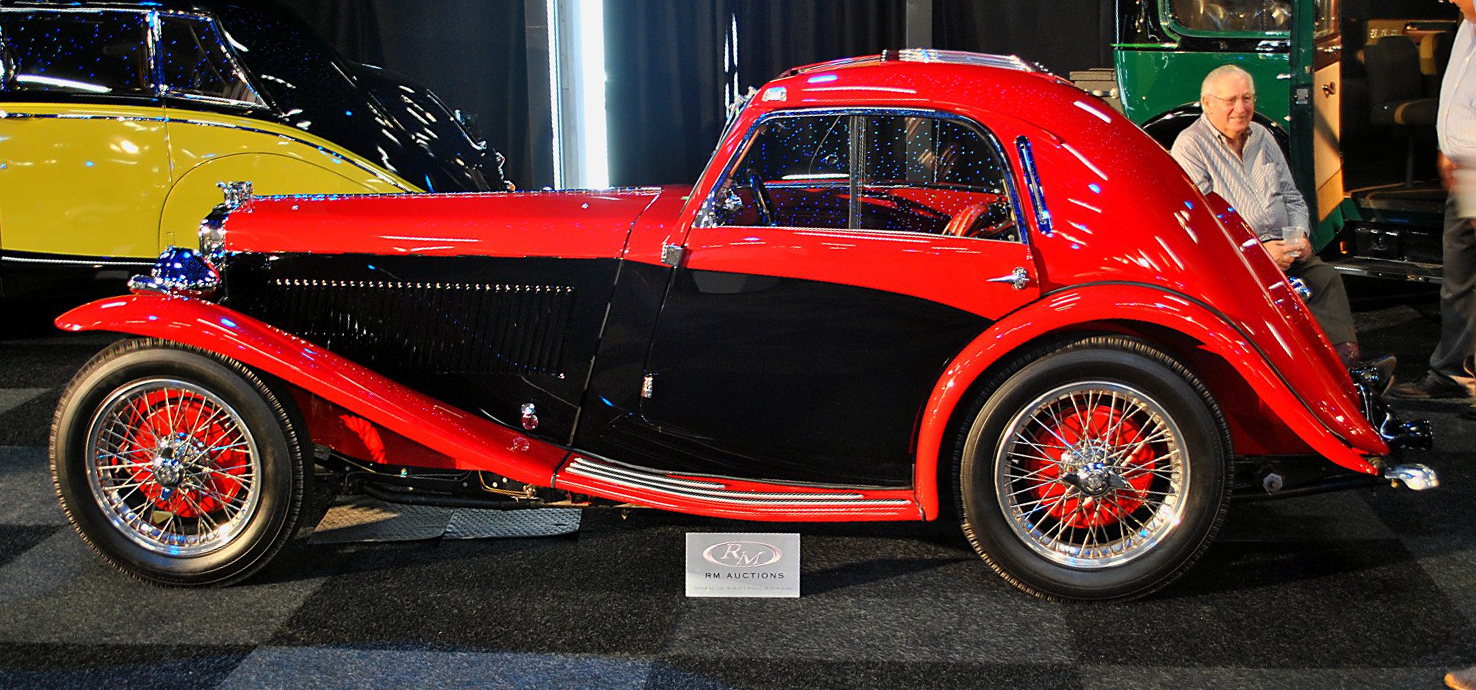
MG NB Magnette Airline Coupé

== ND ==
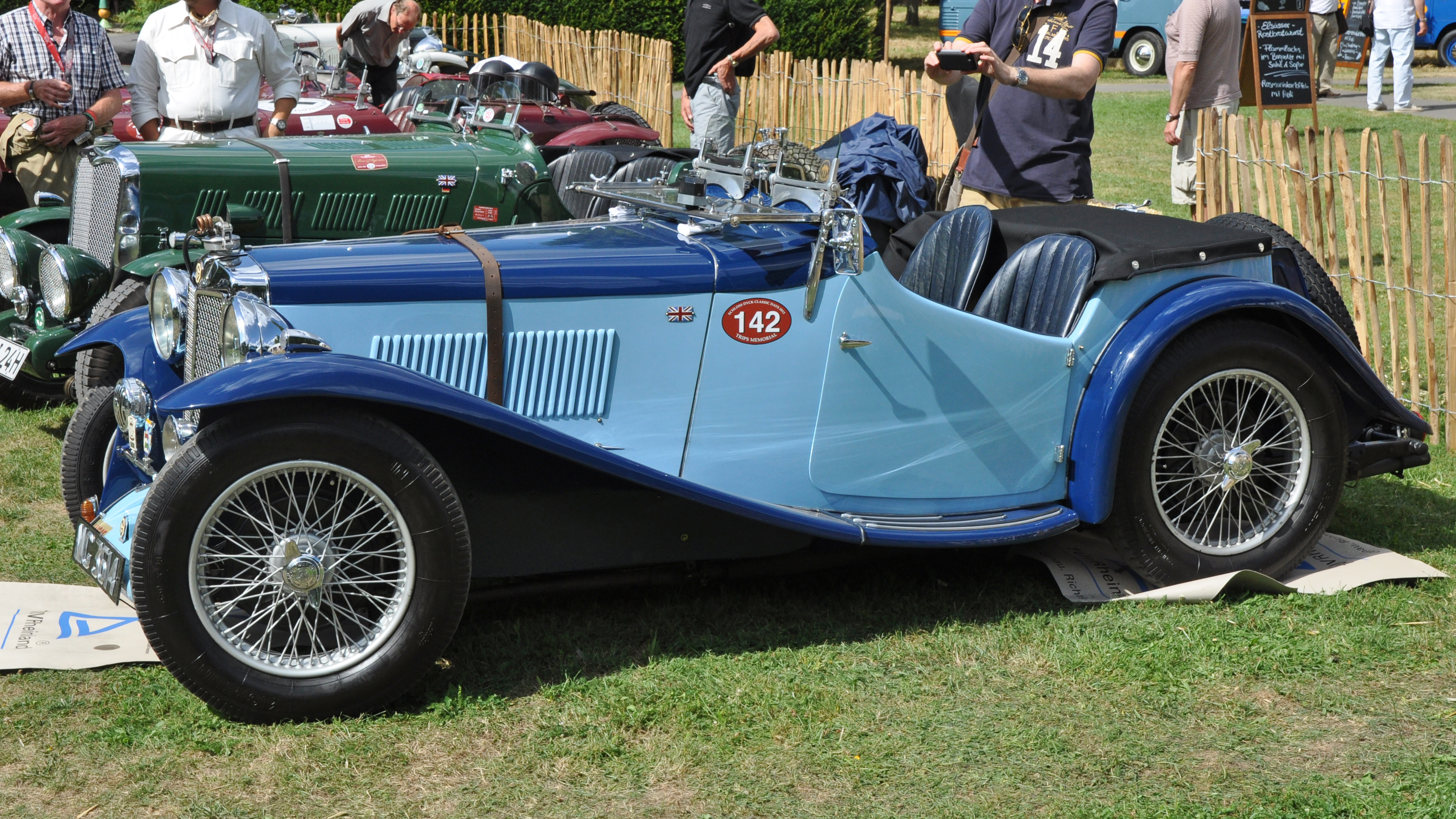
MG ND Magnette

The ND was a special model using unsold MG K2 bodies fitted to the N-Type chassis probably only available in 1934. The number made is uncertain as the model does not seem to have been officially listed.

== NE ==
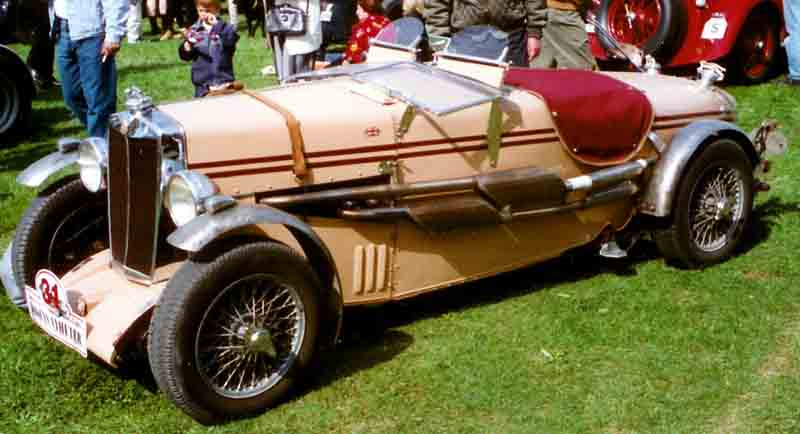
1934 MG NE Magnette

The NE was the competition variant built for the 1934 Tourist Trophy race. Lightweight 2-seat bodies were fitted and the engine was further tuned to give 68 bhp (51 kW) at 6500 rpm. In 1935 three of the cars were fitted with P-Type style bodies and formed the Musketeer racing team which with factory support gained considerable success in various trials.
