= 1958 Australian Tourist Trophy =

Layout of the Mount Panorama Circuit (1938-1986)

The 1958 Australian Tourist Trophy was a 100-mile motor race for sports cars, staged at the Mount Panorama Circuit near Bathurst in New South Wales, Australia on 6 October 1958. It was the second in a sequence of annual Australian Tourist Trophy races, each of which was recognised by the Confederation of Australian Motor Sport as the Australian Championship for sports cars. The race was won by David McKay driving an Aston Martin DB3S.

== Class Structure ==
Cars competed in six classes based on engine capacity:

- Up to 750cc
- 751 to 1100cc
- 1101 to 1500cc
- 1501 to 2000cc
- 2001 to 3000cc
- Over 3000cc

== Results ==
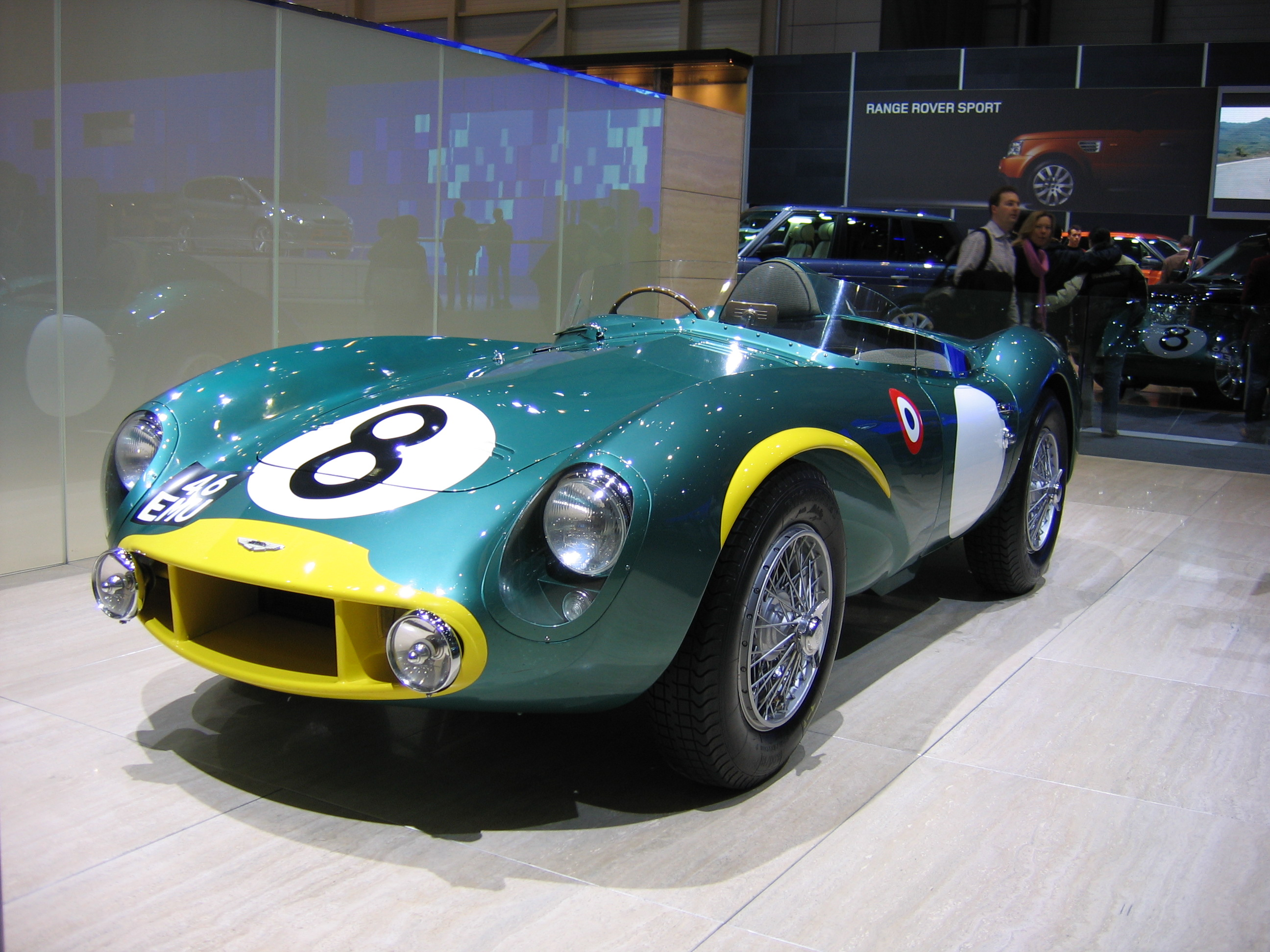
The Aston Martin DB3S which David McKay drove to victory in the 1958 Australian Tourist Trophy.

Position	Driver	No.	Car	Entrant	Class	Class pos.	Laps
1	David McKay	71	Aston Martin DB3S	D. McKay	2001 to 3000cc	1	26
2	Derek Jolly	16	Lotus 15 Coventry Climax	D. Jolly	1101 to 1500cc	1	26
3	Ron Phillips	12	Cooper T38 Jaguar	J. & R. Phillips	Over 3000cc	1	26
4	Frank Matich	87	Jaguar C-Type	Leaton Motors Pty. Ltd.	Over 3000cc	2	26
5	Gavan Sandford-Morgan	5	Decca Special MkII	D. Jolly	751 to 1100cc	1	26
6	Warren Blomfield	116	Aston Martin DB3S	W. Blomfield	2001 to 3000cc	2	26
7	John Roxburgh	77	Austin-Healey 100S	J. Roxburgh	2001 to 3000cc	3	
8	Lyn Archer	3	Cooper Type 39 Coventry Climax	Ecurie van Diemen	751 to 1100cc	2	
9	Tony Basile	10	Porsche 356	A. Basile	1101 to 1500cc	2	
10	Jim Downie	132	MG TB Special	J. Downie	1501 to 2000cc	1	
11	N. Bolton	30	Porsche	N. Bolton	1501 to 2000cc	2	
12	Bruce Maher	74	Buchanan Holden	B. Maher	1501 to 2000cc	2	
13	Charlie Campbell	94	Triumph TR2	C. Campbell	2001 to 3000cc	4	
14	Jim Wright	126	Buchanan TR2	N.J. Wright	1501 to 2000cc	3	
15	Jack Murray	76	Jaguar D-Type	J. Murray	Over 3000cc	3	
16	Bill Clarke	8	Prad Holden	C. Adams	2001 to 3000cc	5	
17	Ted Laker	101	Triumph TR3	E. Laker	2001 to 3000cc	6	
18	Alan Wood	118	MG A	A.R. Wood	1101 to 1500cc	3	
19	H Cape	130	Jaguar XK120	H. Cape	Over 3000cc	4	
20	B.G. Moane	159	MG TF	B.G. Moane	1101 to 1500cc	4	
21	S.N. Miller	22	Austin-Healey 100S	S.N. Miller	2001 to 3000cc	7	
22	Merv Ward	13	Berkeley	M. Ward	Up to 750cc	1	
DNF	Doug Whiteford	7	Maserati 300S	D. Whiteford	2001 to 3000cc		11
DNF	Bill Pitt	1	Jaguar D-Type	Mrs D.I. Anderson	Over 3000cc		
DNF	Charlie Whatmore	4	Lotus Eleven Coventry Climax	Chaz Whatmore's Sports Centre	1101 to 1500cc		
DNF	Tom Corcoran	141	Dorcas MG	T. Corcoran	1101 to 1500cc		
DNF	Frank Cantwell	6	Tojeiro Jaguar	F.D. Cantwell (NZ)	Over 3000cc		
DNF	Harry Kwech	154	Austin-Healey	Leaton Motors Pty. Ltd.	2001 to 3000cc		
DNF	G. Websdale	81	Buchanan MG	Buchanan Motor Co	1101 to 1500cc		
DNF	Barry Taylor	114	Gladiator MG	B. Taylor	1101 to 1500cc		
DNF	H. Binnie	26	MG TF Holden	H. Binnie	2001 to 3000cc		
DNF	A.P. Roberts	110	Jaguar XK120	A.P. Roberts	Over 3000cc		
DNF	Alan Jack	9	Cooper Type 39 Coventry Climax	Brifield Service Station	1101 to 1500cc		
DNF	D. Finch	92	Austin-Healey	D. Finch	2001 to 3000cc		
DNF	Keith Malcolm	153	Skoden Repco Holden	K. Malcolm	2001 to 3000cc		

=== Notes ===
- Attendance: 16,000
- Race distance: 26 laps, 100 miles
- Starters: 35
- Finishers: 22
- Winner's race time: 1 hour 19 minutes 21.9 seconds
