= Australian Tourist Trophy =

- Mount Panorama Circuit
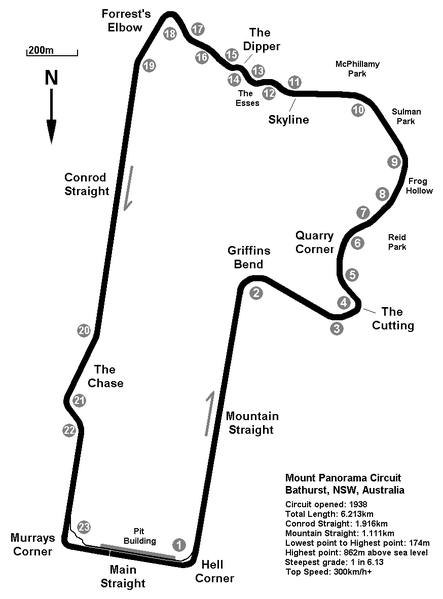

Race information
- Number of times held: 27
- First held: 1956
- Most wins (drivers): (Australia) Frank Matich (4)
- Most wins (constructors): (United Kingdom) Lotus (4) (Germany) Porsche (4)
- Circuit length: 6.172 km (3.835 miles)
- Laps: 12 Hours

The Australian Tourist Trophy is a Confederation of Australian Motor Sport-sanctioned national motor racing title, contested between 1956 and 1979 by Sports Cars and, since 2007, by GT cars. The trophy is currently awarded to the outright winners of the Bathurst 12 Hour.

== History ==
The title was awarded for the first time in 1956 and then annually from 1958 until the introduction by CAMS of an Australian Sports Car Championship for 1969. It was reinstituted in 1975, restricted for the first time to Production Sports Cars and contested over two heats rather than as a single race. In 1976, with the Production Sports Car class now contesting the Australian Sports Car Championship, the Australian Tourist Trophy once again became a contest for purpose built Group A Sports Cars until it was discontinued after the 1979 event.

After almost thirty years, the ATT title was again revived with the award going to the winner of the Sandown GT Classic in both 2007 and 2008. From 2009 until 2015 the Trophy was awarded to the driver accumulating the most outright championship points at specified rounds of the annual Australian GT Championship.

From 2017, the Australian Tourist Trophy has been awarded to the winners of the annual Bathurst 12 Hour event.

== Winners ==
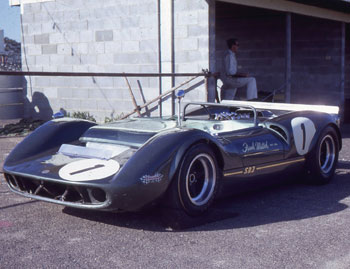
The Matich SR3 of Frank Matich, winner of the 1967 and 1968 ATTs.

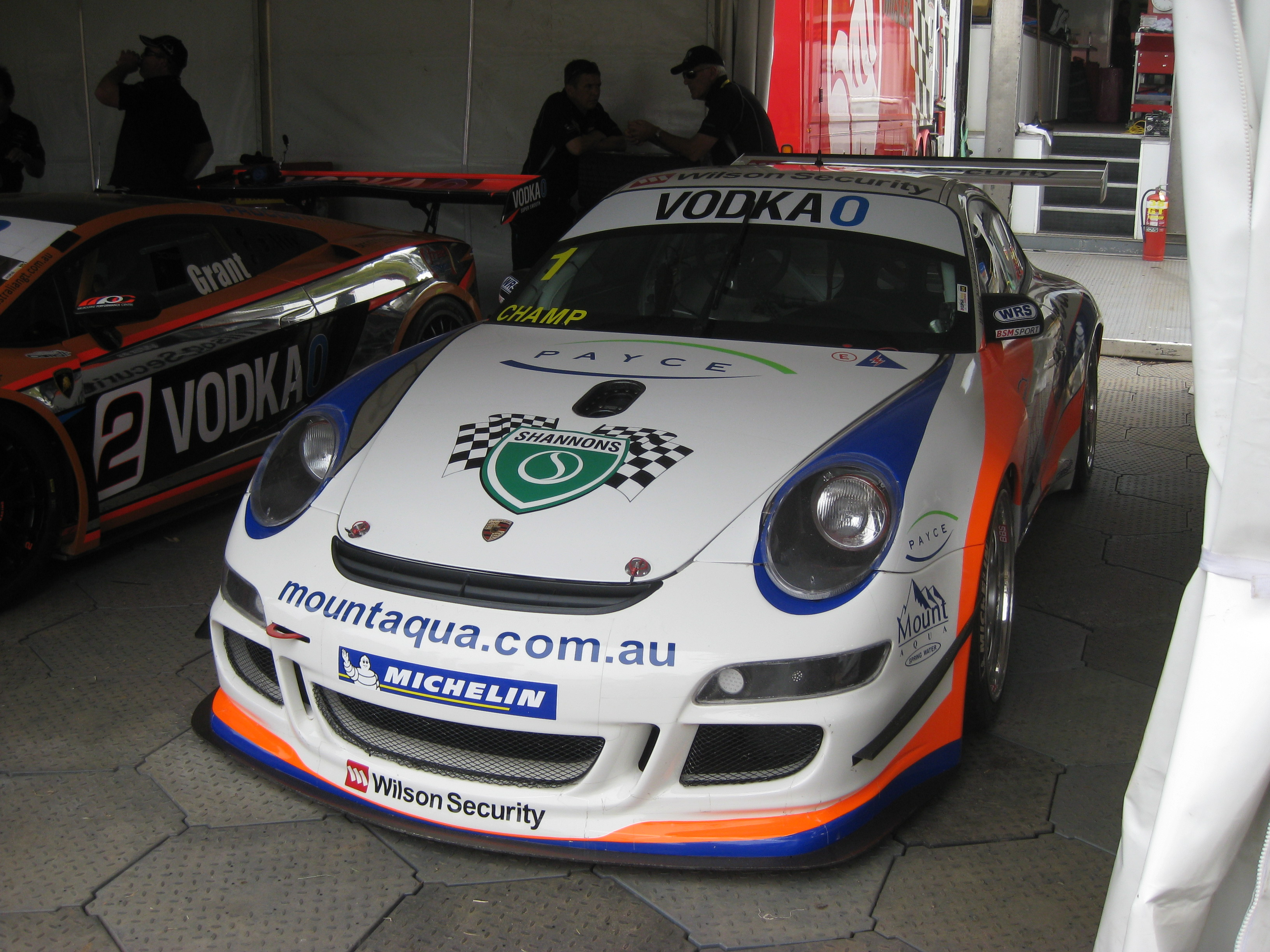
The Porsche 911 GT3 Cup Type 997 of 2010 ATT winner David Wall, pictured at the opening round of the 2010 Australian GT Championship.

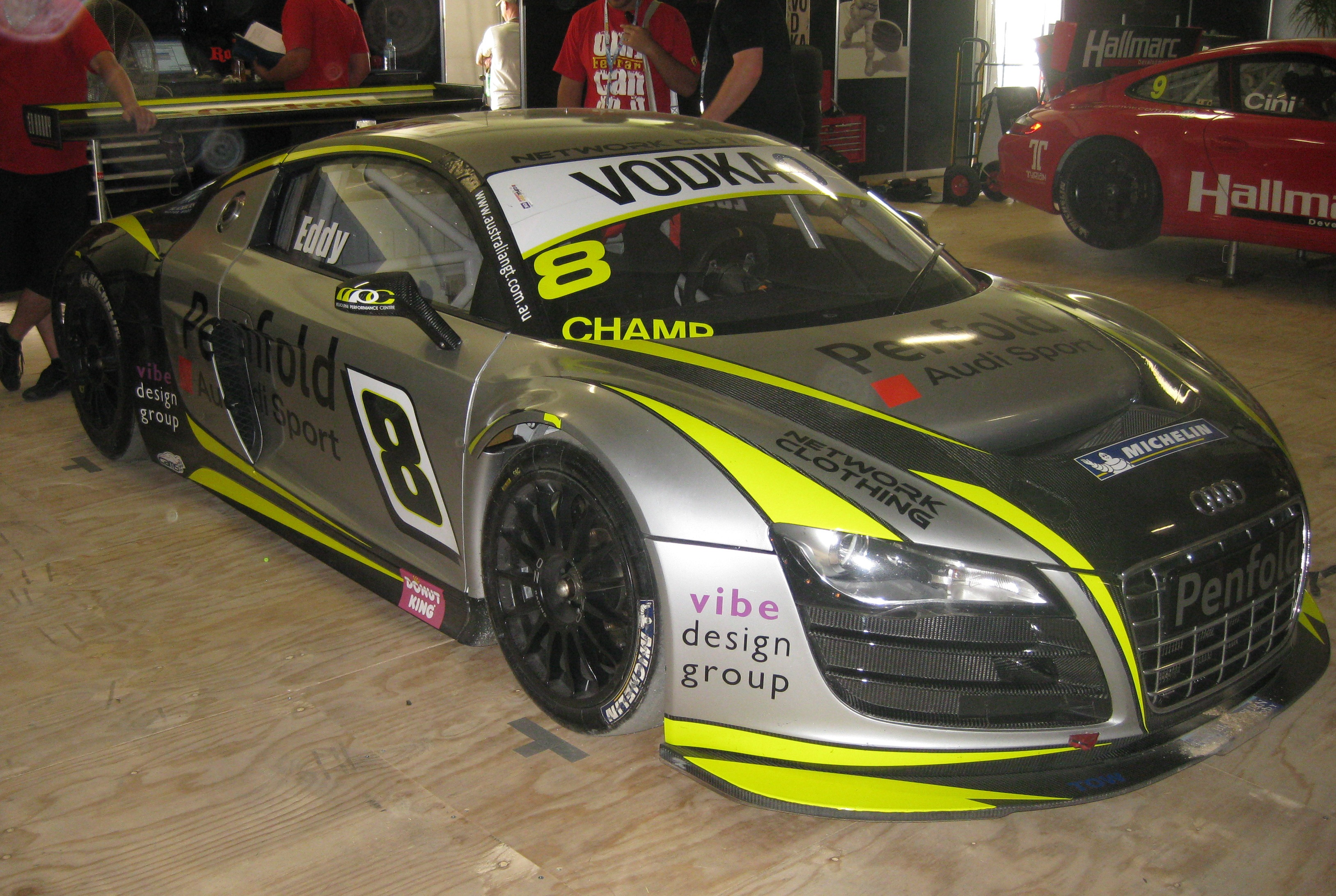
The Audi R8 LMS of 2011 ATT winner Mark Eddy, pictured at the opening round of the 2011 Australian GT Championship.

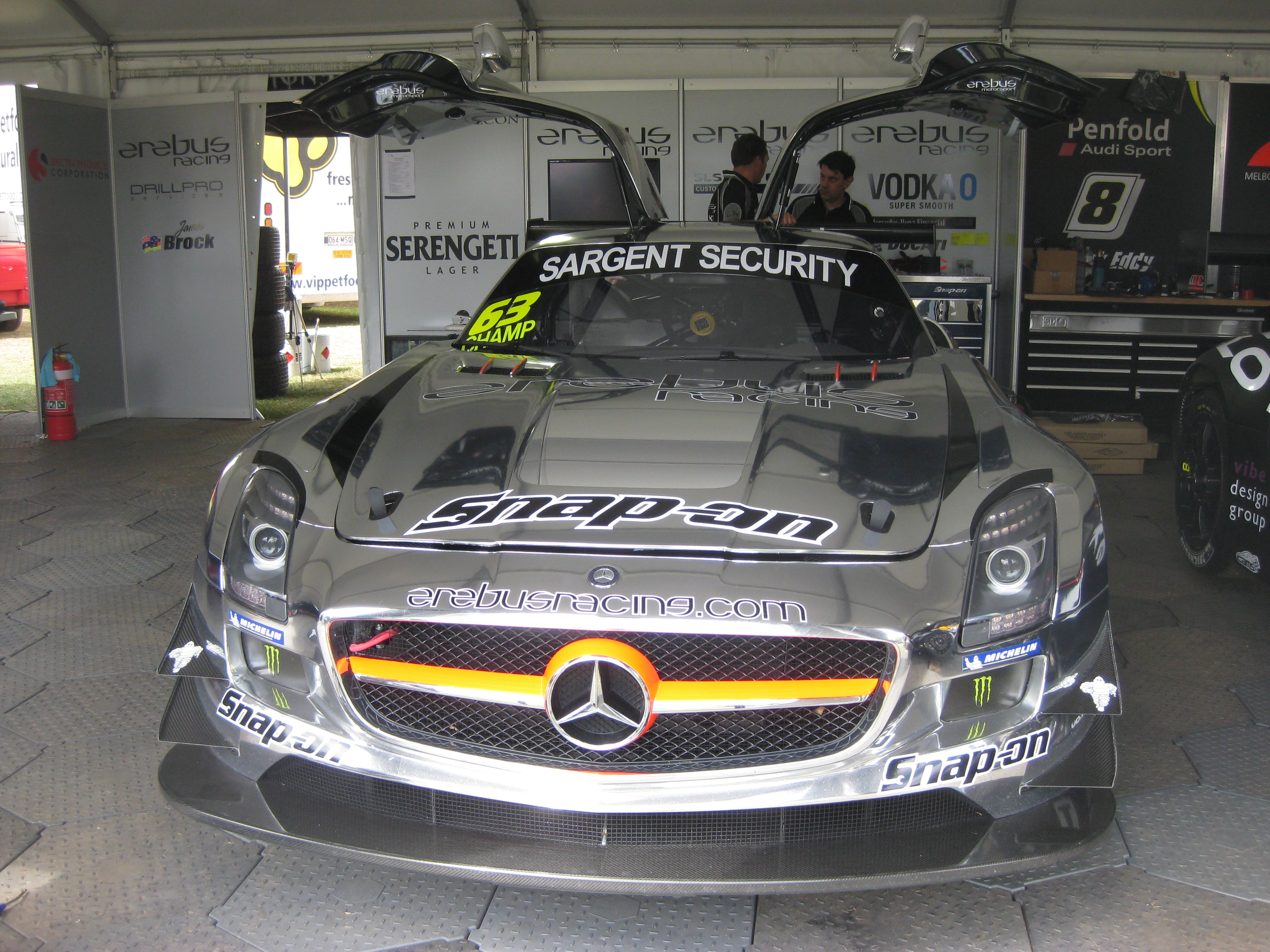
The Mercedes-Benz SLS AMG of 2012 ATT winner Peter Hackett, pictured at the opening round of the 2012 Australian GT Championship.

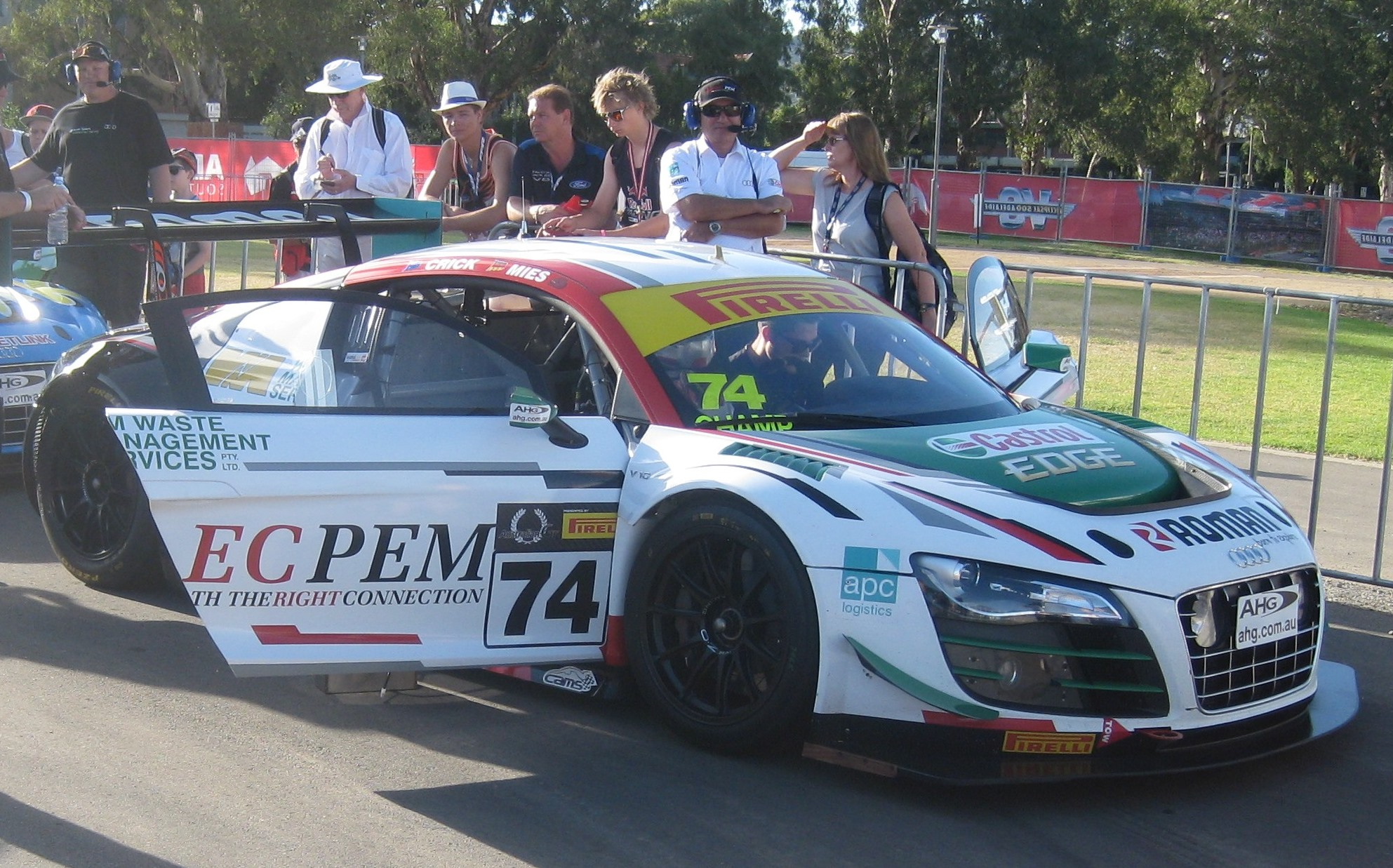
The Audi R8 Ultra of 2015 ATT winner Christopher Mies, pictured at the opening round of the 2015 Australian GT Championship.

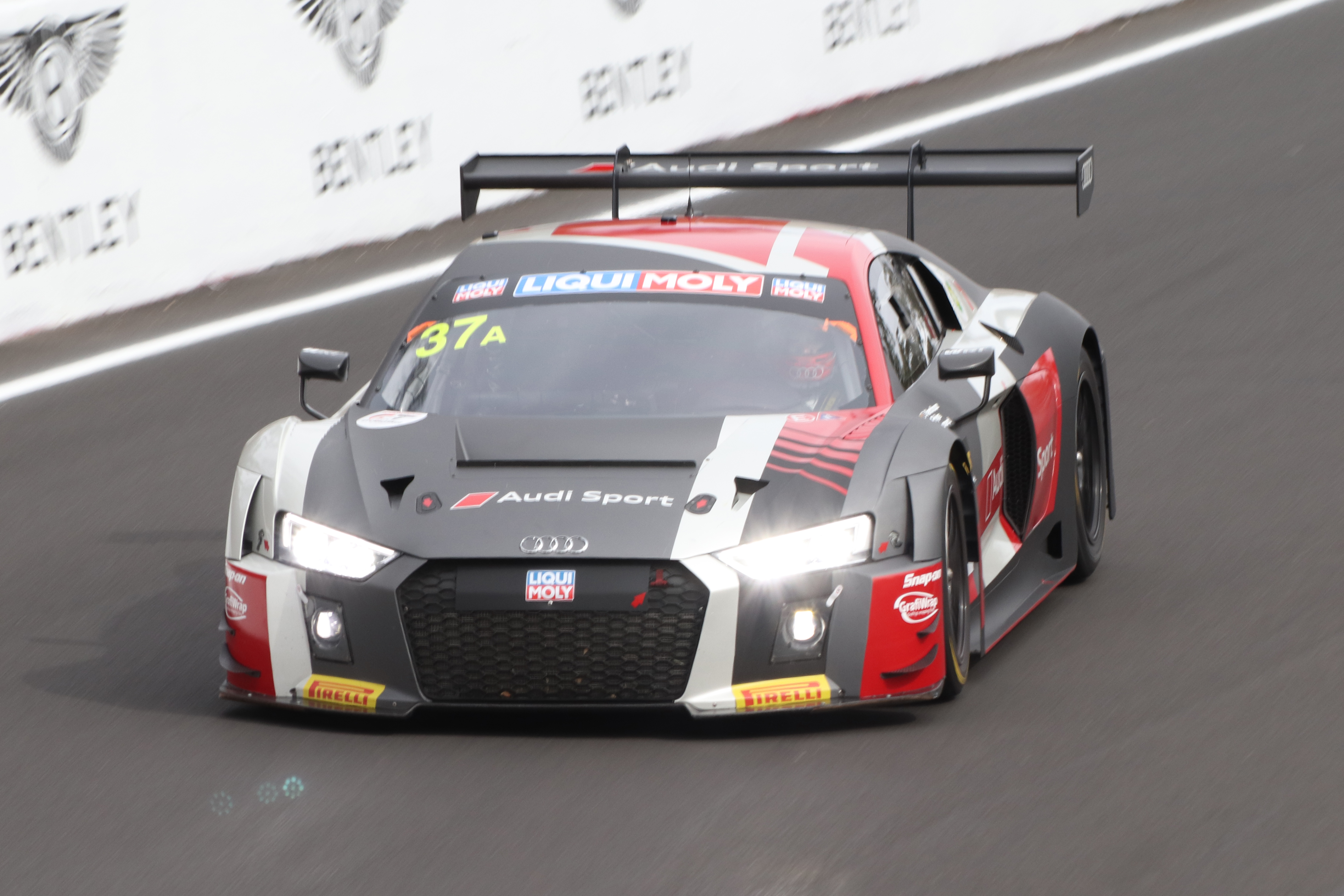
Robin Frijns, Stuart Leonard and Dries Vanthoor were awarded the 2018 ATT for their victory in the 2018 Liqui Moly Bathurst 12 Hour driving an Audi R8 LMS.

Year	Winner	Car	Circuit	Date
1956	(United Kingdom) Stirling Moss	Maserati 300S	Albert Park	25 November
1957	Event cancelled			
1958	(Australia) David McKay	Aston Martin DB3S	Bathurst	5 October
1959	(Australia) Ron Phillips	Cooper T38 Jaguar	Lowood	14 June
1960	(Australia) Derek Jolly	Lotus 15 Coventry Climax	Longford	7 March
1961	(Australia) Bib Stillwell	Cooper Monaco Coventry Climax	Bathurst	1 October
1962	(Australia) Bib Stillwell	Cooper Monaco Coventry Climax	Mallala	28 December
1963	(Australia) Ian Geoghegan	Lotus 23	Lowood	9 June
1964	(Australia) Frank Matich	Lotus 19b Coventry Climax	Longford	29 February
1965	(Australia) Ian Geoghegan	Lotus 23 Ford	Lakeside	14 November
1966	(Australia) Frank Matich	Elfin 400 Traco Oldsmobile	Longford	7 March
1967	(Australia) Frank Matich	Matich SR3 Oldsmobile	Surfers Paradise	21 May
1968	(Australia) Frank Matich	Matich SR3 Repco	Mallala	29 January
1969 - 1974	not awarded			
1975	(Australia) Peter Warren	Bolwell Nagari	Calder	May
1976	(Australia) Stuart Kostera	Elfin MS7 Repco Holden	Phillip Island	21 November
1977	(Australia) Ian Geoghegan	Porsche 935	Phillip Island	13 November
1978	(Australia) Greg Doidge	Elfin 360 Repco	Calder	3 December
1979	(Australia) Paul Gibson	Rennmax Repco	Winton	28 October
1980 - 2006	not awarded			
2007	(Denmark) Allan Simonsen (Australia) Tim Leahey	Ferrari 430	Sandown	9 December
2008	(Australia) Nick O’Halloran (Denmark) Allan Simonsen	Ferrari 430 GT	Sandown	28–30 November
2009	(Australia) David Wall	Porsche 911 GT3 Cup S Type 997	Phillip Island & Eastern Creek	16–17 May & 18–19 July
2010	(Australia) David Wall	Porsche 911 GT3 Cup S Type 997	Phillip Island & Eastern Creek	29–30 May & 11 July
2011	(Australia) Mark Eddy	Audi R8 LMS	Phillip Island & Eastern Creek	28–29 May & 2–4 September
2012	(Australia) Peter Hackett	Mercedes-Benz SLS AMG GT3	Phillip Island & Eastern Creek	25–27 May & 13–15 July
2013	not awarded			
2014	(Australia) Richard Muscat	Mercedes-Benz SLS AMG GT3	Phillip Island & Highlands Motorsport Park	23–25 May & 8–9 November
2015	(Germany) Christopher Mies	Audi R8 Ultra	Phillip Island & Sydney Motorsport Park	22–23 May & 21–23 August
2016	not awarded			
2017	(Australia) Craig Lowndes (Finland) Toni Vilander (Australia) Jamie Whincup	Ferrari 488 GT3	Bathurst	5 February
2018	(Netherlands) Robin Frijns (United Kingdom) Stuart Leonard (Belgium) Dries Vanthoor	Audi R8 LMS GT3	Bathurst	4 February
2019	(Australia) Matt Campbell (Norway) Dennis Olsen (Germany) Dirk Werner	Porsche 911 GT3 R	Bathurst	3 February
2020	(France) Jules Gounon (South Africa) Jordan Pepper (Belgium) Maxime Soulet	Bentley Continental GT3	Bathurst	2 February
2021	not held due COVID-19 pandemic			
2022	(Australia) Kenny Habul (Austria) Martin Konrad (France) Jules Gounon (Germany) Luca Stolz	Mercedes-AMG GT3 Evo	Bathurst	15 May
2023	(Australia) Kenny Habul (France) Jules Gounon (Germany) Luca Stolz	Mercedes-AMG GT3 Evo	Bathurst	5 February
2024	(Australia) Matt Campbell (Turkey) Ayhancan Güven (Belgium) Laurens Vanthoor	Porsche 911 GT3 R (992)	Bathurst	18 February
2025	(South Africa) Kelvin van der Linde (South Africa) Sheldon van der Linde (Brazil) Augusto Farfus	BMW M4 GT3	Bathurst	2 February

== Multiple winners ==
=== By driver ===
Wins	Driver	Years
4	(Australia) Frank Matich	1964, 1966, 1967, 1968
3	(Australia) Ian Geoghegan	1963, 1965, 1977
2	(Australia) Bib Stillwell	1961, 1962
2	(Denmark) Allan Simonsen	2007, 2008
2	(Australia) David Wall	2009, 2010
2	(Australia) Matt Campbell	2019, 2024
2	(France) Jules Gounon	2020, 2022

=== By constructor ===
Wins	Constructor
5	(Germany) Porsche
4	(United Kingdom) Lotus
3	(United Kingdom) Cooper
3	(Australia) Elfin
3	(Italy) Ferrari
3	(Germany) Audi
3	(Germany) Mercedes-Benz
2	(Australia) Matich

== See also ==
- 1936 Australian Tourist Trophy, for the unrelated motor race held at Phillip Island on 30 March 1936.
- Australian Tourist Trophy (for motorcycles)
