= 1960 Australian Tourist Trophy =

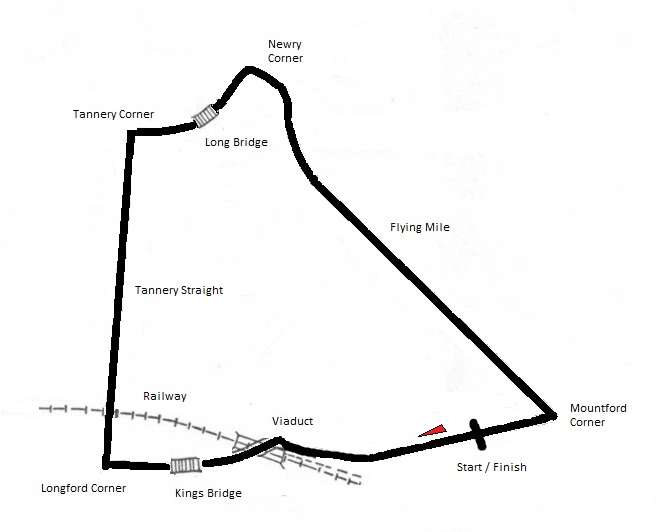
Layout of the Longford Circuit (1953-1968)

The 1960 Australian Tourist Trophy was a motor race for sports cars, staged at the Longford Circuit in Tasmania, Australia on Monday, 7 March 1960. It was the fourth in a sequence of annual Australian Tourist Trophy races, with each of these being recognized by the Confederation of Australian Motor Sport as the Australian Championship for sports cars.

The race was won by Derek Jolly driving a Lotus 15.

== Results ==
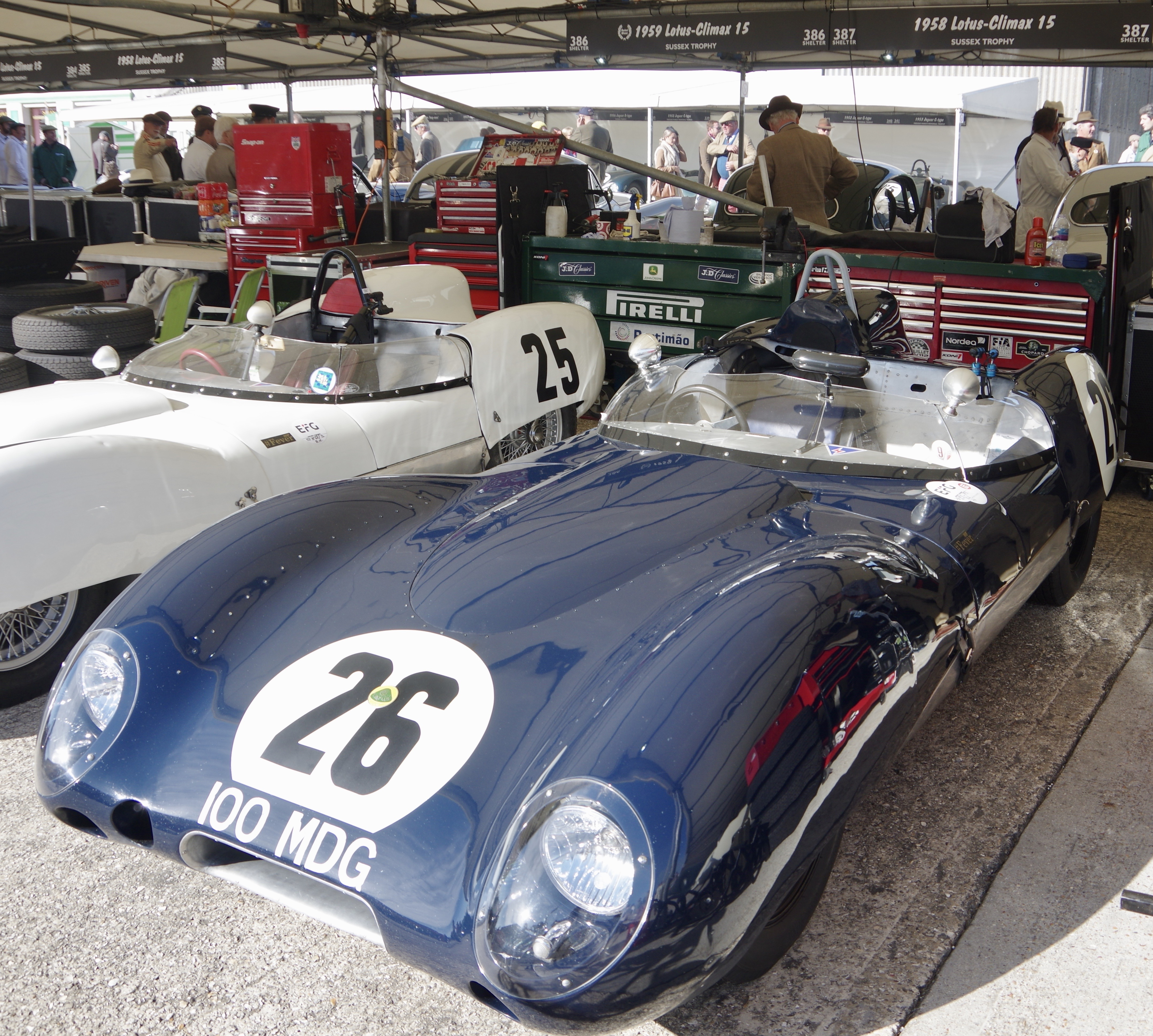
Derek Jolly won the 1960 Australian Tourist Trophy driving a Lotus 15, similar to that pictured above

Position	Driver	No.	Car	Entrant	Class	Class pos.	Laps
1	Derek Jolly	33	Lotus 15	D. E. Jolly	Class II – 1501 to 2000 cc	1	24
2	Doug Whiteford	10	Maserati 300S	D. Whiteford	Class III – Over 2000 cc	1	
3	Frank Matich	87	Jaguar D-Type	Leaton Motors (Sportscars) P/L	Class III – Over 2000 cc	2	
4	John Ampt	32	Decca Special	J. Ampt	Class I – Under 1500 cc	1	
5	Tom Sulman	99	Aston Martin DB3S	T. N. Sulman	Class III – Over 2000 cc	3	
6	David Finch	92	Jaguar D-Type	D. Finch	Class III – Over 2000 cc	4	
7	Eddie Perkins	46	Porsche 1600	D. Calvert	Class II – 1501 to 2000 cc	2	
8	Tony Basile	15	Porsche Carrera	S. Sakzewski	Class I – Under 1500 cc	2	
?	Alan Jack	8	Cooper Type 39 Coventry Climax	Briefield Motors	Class I – Under 1500 cc		
?	Gerald Tattersall	12	Buchanan MG	G. Tattersall	Class I – Under 1500 cc		
?	Harry Cape	17	MGA Coupe	H. C. Cape	Class II – 1501 to 2000 cc		
?	T. Cleary	16	Austin-Healey 100S	T. J. Cleary	Class III – Over 2000 cc		
?	Ray Gibbs	34	Cooper Type 39 Coventry Climax	Sabina Motors Industries P/L.	Class I – Under 1500 cc		
?	J. Barker	25	Austin-Healey 100	T. R. Langenheim	Class III – Over 2000 cc		
?	G. Watt	18	MG Holden	Donald Gorringe Used Cars	Class III – Over 2000 cc		
?	?	101	Triumph TR				
?	Jim Barrie	120	Zephyr Special				
?	Ron Ward	14	MGA Twin Cam	R. S. Ward	Class II – 1501 to 2000 cc		
DNF	J. Wright	126	Aston Martin DB3S	J. Wright	Class III – Over 2000 cc		
DNF	Ron Phillips	42	Cooper T38 Jaguar	J. K. & R. K. Phillips	Class III – Over 2000 cc		14

=== Notes ===
- Attendance: 12,000
- Pole position: Ron Phillips
- Starters: 22
- Race distance: 24 laps – 108 miles
- Race time of winning car: 69 minutes 20 seconds
- Fastest lap: Derek Jolly & Doug Whiteford – 2 minutes 50 seconds, (95.29 m.p.h., a sports car record)
