= 1958 Tourist Trophy =

The 1958 Tourist Trophy may refer to the following races:

- The 1958 Isle of Man TT, for Grand Prix Motorcycles
- The 1958 RAC Tourist Trophy, for sports cars held at Goodwood
- The 1958 Australian Tourist Trophy, for sports cars held at Mount Panorama
- The 1958 Victorian Tourist Trophy, for sports cars held at Albert Park
- The 1958 Dutch TT, for Grand Prix Motorcycles held at Assen
