= 1959 Tourist Trophy =

The 1959 Tourist Trophy may refer to the following races:

- The 1959 Isle of Man TT, for Grand Prix Motorcycles
- The 1959 RAC Tourist Trophy, for sports cars held at Goodwood
- The 1959 Australian Tourist Trophy, for sports cars held at Lowood
- The 1959 Dutch TT, for Grand Prix Motorcycles held at Assen
