= 1959 Australian Tourist Trophy =

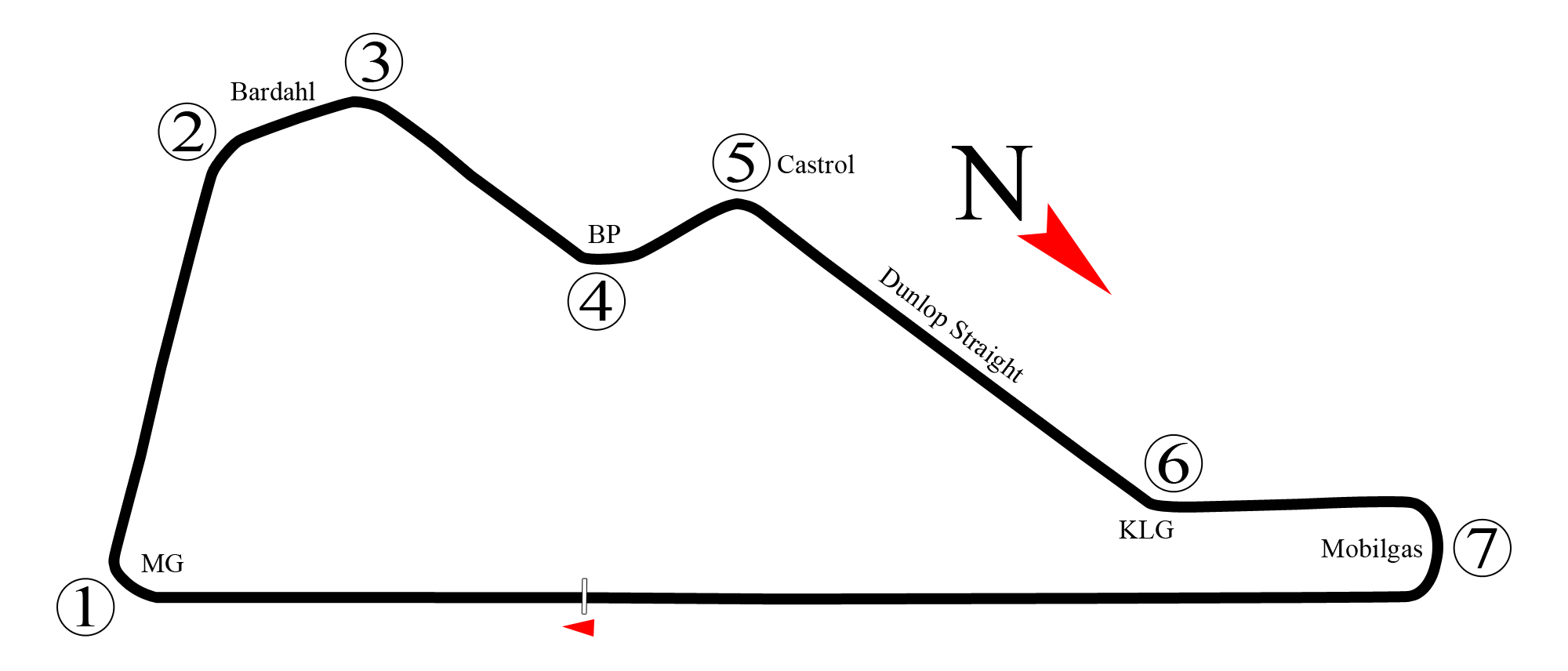
Layout of the Lowood Airfield Circuit (1946-1966)

The 1959 Australian Tourist Trophy was a motor race for sports cars staged at the Lowood circuit in Queensland, Australia on 14 June 1959. It was the third in a sequence of annual Australian Tourist Trophy races, each of these being recognised by the Confederation of Australian Motor Sport as the Australian Championship for sports cars.

The race was won by Ron Phillips driving a Cooper T38 Jaguar.

== Results ==
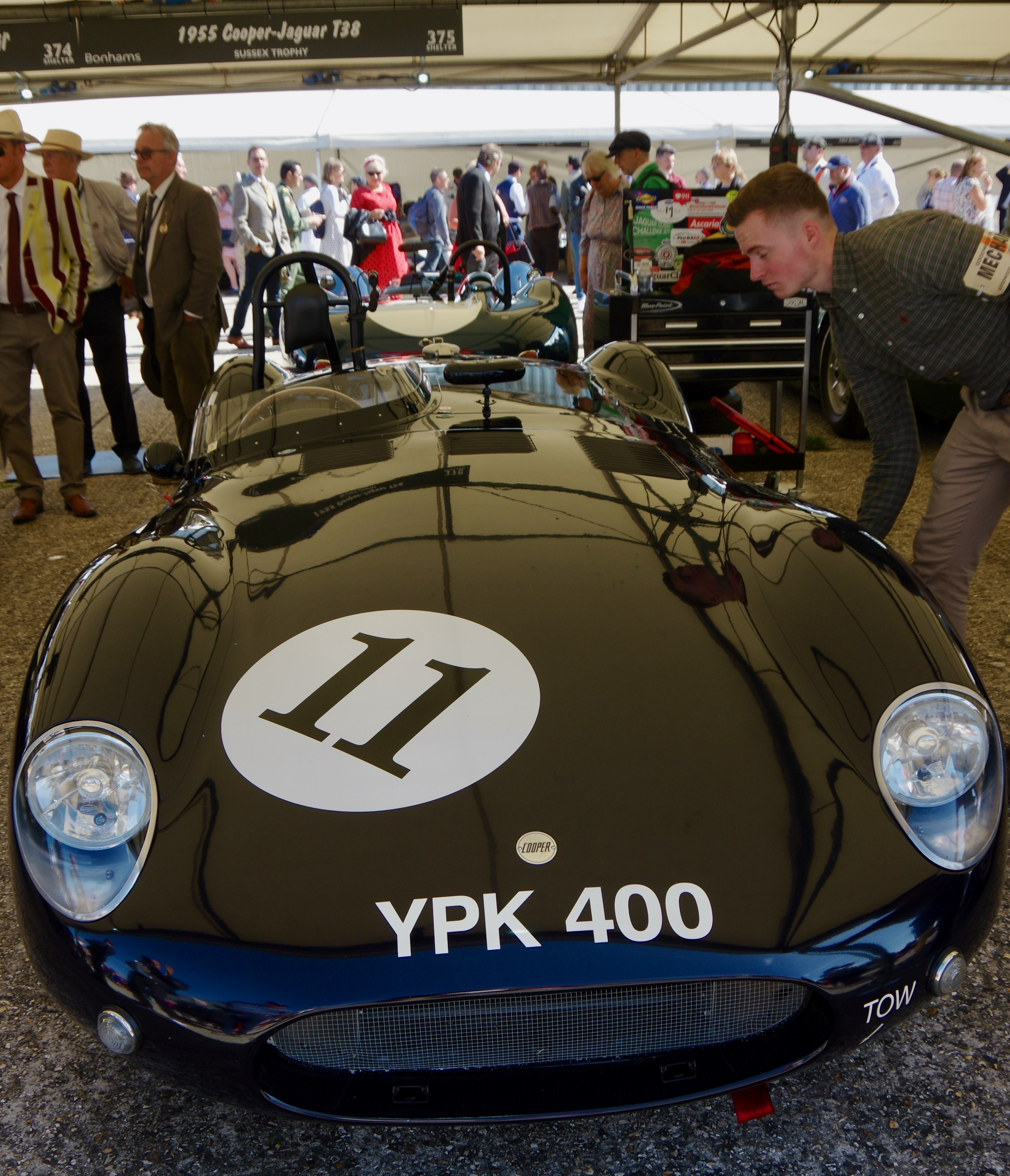
A Cooper T38 Jaguar, similar to the winning car

Position	Driver	No.	Car	Entrant	Class pos.	Class	Time / laps
1	Ron Phillips	42	Cooper T38 Jaguar	J. K. & R. K. Phillips	1	3001 cc and Over	73:28
2	Bill Pitt	1	Jaguar D-Type	Mrs. D. I. Anderson	2	3001 cc and Over	73:49
3	Bob Jane	56	Maserati 300S	R. Jane	1	2001 to 3000 cc	34
4	John Ampt	58	Decca Special MK II	J. E. Ampt	1	Up to 1100 cc	34
5	Allan Jack	45	Cooper Type 39 Coventry Climax	Brifield Motors	1	1101 to 1500 cc	34
6	Les Agnew	10	Lotus Mk 11 Series II Le Mans Coventry Climax	Rockhampton Car Sales	2	Up to 1100 cc	33
7	T. Basile	31	Porsche Carrera	S. Sakzewski	2	1101 to 1500 cc	33
8	Tom Ross	18	Triumph TR2	T. W. Ross	1	1501 to 2000 cc	32
9	B. Coventry	28	MGA	B. Coventry	3	1101 to 1500 cc	30
10	E. Laker	101	Triumph TR3	E. F. Laker	2	1501 to 2000 cc	29
11	J. Ausina	66	MGA	J. Ausina	4	1101 to 1500 cc	29
12	P. Samuels	63	Berkeley	P. Samuels	3	Up to 1100 cc	23
DNF	John Cleary	36	Austin-Healey 100S	J. Cleary	-	2001 to 3000 cc	31
DNF	Chas Whatmore	4	Lotus Mk 11 Series II Le Mans Coventry Climax	Chas Whatmore's Sports & Electrical Centre	-	1101 to 1500 cc	16
DNF	I. Adams	57	Austin-Healey Sprite		-	Up to 1100 cc	14
DNF	Frank Matich	87	Jaguar C-Type	Leaton Motors (Sports Cars) Pty. Ltd.	-	3001 cc and Over	13
DNF	David Finch	92	Jaguar D-Type	D. N. Finch	-	3001 cc and Over	13
DNF	J. Bonenti	6	MG TF 1500	J. A. Bonenti	-	1101 to 1500 cc	12
DNF	D. Geary	55	Austin-Healey	D. Geary	-	2001 to 3000 cc	4

=== Notes ===
- Meeting organiser: QRDC (Queensland Racing Drivers Club)
- Attendance: 20,000 (record crowd)
- Race distance: 36 laps, 102 miles
- Number of starters: 19
- Number of finishers: 12
- First Queensland competitor: Bill Pitt (Jaguar D-Type)
- Fastest Lap: Phillips and Pitt, 1:59
- New GT lap record: T Basile (Porsche Carrera), 2:13
- Handicap results (over first 20 laps): 1st - B Coventry (MGA), 2nd - Tom Ross (Triumph TR2), 3rd - T Basile (Porsche Carrera)
