= 1956 Tourist Trophy =

The 1956 Tourist Trophy may refer to the following races:

- The 1956 Isle of Man TT, for Grand Prix Motorcycles
- The 1956 Dutch TT, for Grand Prix Motorcycles held at Assen
- The 1956 Australian Tourist Trophy, for sports cars held at Albert Park
