= 1955 Moomba TT =

The 1955 Moomba TT was a motor race staged at the Albert Park Circuit in Victoria, Australia on 26 March 1955. The race, which featured a Le Mans start, was open to 'Sports Cars Open and Closed', competing with restricted fuel. It was staged as part of the Argus Moomba Motor Car Races, the meeting being sponsored by the Argus newspaper and organised by the Light Car Club of Australia in collaboration with the Albert Park Trust and the Moomba Festival Committee.

The race was won by Doug Whiteford (Triumph TR2) from Haig Hurst (Austin-Healey) and EJ Brotherton (Austin-Healey).

== Race results ==
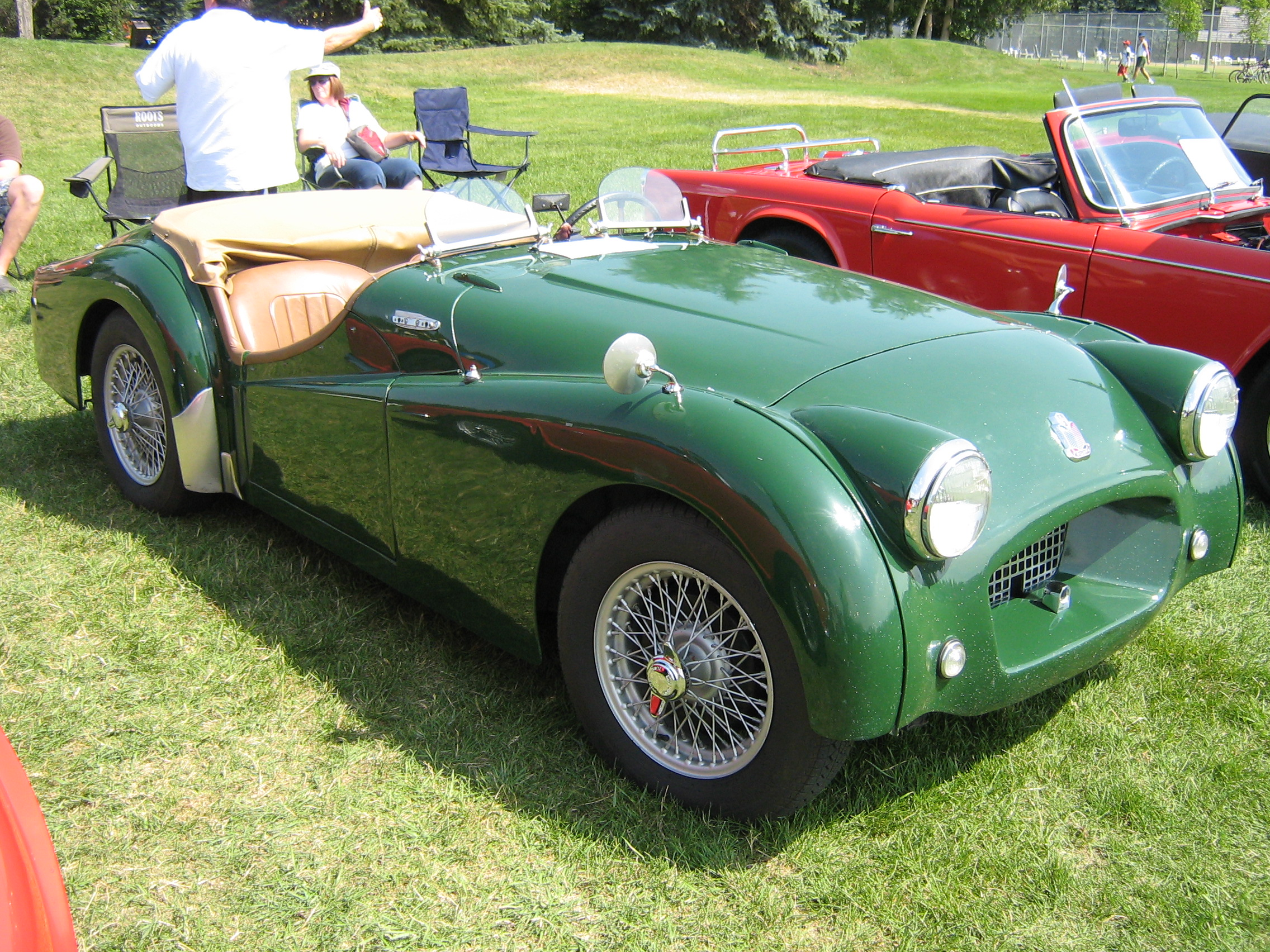
Doug Whiteford won the race driving a Triumph TR2 similar to the example pictured above

Position	Driver	No	Car	Entrant	Laps	Class	Class pos
1	Doug Whiteford	50	Triumph TR2	D Whiteford	32	1501-3000cc	1
2	Haig Hurst	55	Austin-Healey	HW Hurst	32	1501-3000cc	2
3	EJ Brotherton	27	Austin-Healey	CR Dickason	32	1501-3000cc	3
4	RK Phillips	24	Allard K2	RK Phillips	32	3001cc and Over	1
5	WH Hayes	54	Triumph TR2	WH Hayes	31	1501-3000cc	4
6	WJ Craig	51	Triumph TR2	WJ Craig	31	1501-3000cc	5
7	Stuart Charge	59	Austin-Healey	S Charge	31	1501-3000cc	6
8	GV Bateman	52	Austin-Healey	GV Bateman	30	1501-3000cc	7
9	GW Baillieu	56	Triumph TR2	GW Baillieu	29	1501-3000cc	8
10	Brian Sampson	60	Austin-Healey 100/4	B Sampson	29	1501-3000cc	9
11	RS Andrews	66	MG TF	RS Andrews	28	1101-1500cc	1
12	CW Carter	68	MG TF	CW Carter	28	1101-1500cc	2
?	IA Martin	63	MG TC	IA Martin		1101-1500cc	3
?	R Lesock	74	MG TC	R Lesock		1101-1500cc	4
?	Rod Jackson	79	Fiat 1100 TV	RG Jackson		Up to 1100cc	1
?	J Old	78	Fiat 1100 TV	J Old		Up to 1100cc	2
?	C Martyn	58	Sunbeam 3 Litre	C Martyn		1501-3000cc	
?	EJ Davey-Milne	64	Frazer-Nash	EJ Davey-Milne		1101-1500cc	
?	WH Egan	35	MG TC special	WH Egan		1101-1500cc	
?	DB Young	89	Singer	DB Young		Up to 1100cc	
?	AJ Johnston	75	HRG	AJ Johnston		1101-1500cc	
?	Neil Charge	73	MG TC special	NK Charge		1101-1500cc	
?	JH Haisley	47	Jaguar XK120	JH Haisley		3001cc and Over	
DNF	Harry Firth	61	MG TC special	HL Firth		1501-3000cc	
DNF	Allan Gray	44	Jaguar XK120 Coupe	AR Gray		3001cc and Over	
DNF	R Page	46	Jaguar XK120	R Page		3001cc and Over	
DNF	L Molina	25	MM Holden	L Molina		1501-3000cc	

- Race distance: 32 laps, 100 miles (161 km)
- Number of entries in Official Programme: 40
- Number of starters: unknown
- Number of finishers: unknown
- Pole position: Allan Gray (Jaguar XK120 Coupe)
- Winner's race time: 78:27 (76.5 mph)
- Fastest lap: Doug Whiteford, (Triumph TR2), 2:23 (78.5 mph)
