= 2007 Sandown GT Classic =

Track map of the Sandown Raceway

The 2007 Sandown GT Classic was a motor race staged at Sandown International Motor Raceway in Victoria, Australia on 9 December 2007 over a duration of 3 hours and 30 minutes. It was the eighth and final round of the 2007 Australian GT Championship.

The race was won by the Sirena Racing driver pairing of Danish driver Allan Simonsen and his co-driver Tim Leahey who joined the team just for this race. The Sirena Ferrari F430 finished a full two laps ahead of the Lamborghini Gallardo of Ian Palmer and Paul Stokell. John Teulan and Steven Johnson finished third in a Ferrari F430, another two laps behind.

== Results ==
| Pos | No | Team | Drivers | Chassis | Laps | Points |
| Pos | No | Team | Drivers | Engine | Laps | Points |
|---|---|---|---|---|---|---|
| 1 | 80 | Sirena Racing | (Denmark) Allan Simonsen (Australia) Tim Leahey | Ferrari F430 | 158 | 114 |
| 1 | 80 | Sirena Racing | (Denmark) Allan Simonsen (Australia) Tim Leahey | Ferrari 4.3L V8 | 158 | 114 |
| 2 | 20 | Palmer Steel Industries | (Australia) Ian Palmer (Australia) Paul Stokell | Lamborghini Gallardo | 156 | 96 |
| 2 | 20 | Palmer Steel Industries | (Australia) Ian Palmer (Australia) Paul Stokell | Lamborghini 5.0L V10 | 156 | 96 |
| 3 | 88 | Industry Central; Stahlwille | (Australia) John Teulan (Australia) Steven Johnson | Ferrari F430 | 154 | 84 |
| 3 | 88 | Industry Central; Stahlwille | (Australia) John Teulan (Australia) Steven Johnson | Ferrari 4.3L V8 | 154 | 84 |
| 4 | 90 | Cooks Construction | (Australia) Jon Trende (Australia) Sven Burchartz (Australia) Dean Fiore | Porsche 996 GT3 Cup | 153 | 75 |
| 4 | 90 | Cooks Construction | (Australia) Jon Trende (Australia) Sven Burchartz (Australia) Dean Fiore | Porsche 3.6L Flat-6 | 153 | 75 |
| 5 | 77 | The Oxford Tavern Wollongong | (Australia) Anthony Kosseris (Australia) Matt Hunt | Porsche 996 GT3 Cup | 152 | 69 |
| 5 | 77 | The Oxford Tavern Wollongong | (Australia) Anthony Kosseris (Australia) Matt Hunt | Porsche 3.6L Flat-6 | 152 | 69 |
| 6 | 11 | Taplin Real Estate; ANZ Banking | (Australia) Andrew Taplin (Australia) Dean Evans | Porsche 996 GT3 Cup | 150 | 63 |
| 6 | 11 | Taplin Real Estate; ANZ Banking | (Australia) Andrew Taplin (Australia) Dean Evans | Porsche 3.6L Flat-6 | 150 | 63 |
| 7 | 7 | Abcor; Preston General Engineering | (Australia) John Kaias (Australia) Will Davison | Aston Martin DBRS9 | 150 | 57 |
| 7 | 7 | Abcor; Preston General Engineering | (Australia) John Kaias (Australia) Will Davison | Aston Martin 6.0L V12 | 150 | 57 |
| 8 | 98 | Zagame Lotus | (Australia) Angelo Lazaris (Australia) Warren Luff | Lotus Exige GT3 | 146 | 54 |
| 8 | 98 | Zagame Lotus | (Australia) Angelo Lazaris (Australia) Warren Luff | Toyota 1.8L I4 | 146 | 54 |
| 9 | 36 | Jaylec; Buzza Auto Electrics | (Australia) Peter Fountas (Australia) Matthew Coleman (Australia) Garth Rainsbury | Porsche 996 GT3 Cup | 144 | 51 |
| 9 | 36 | Jaylec; Buzza Auto Electrics | (Australia) Peter Fountas (Australia) Matthew Coleman (Australia) Garth Rainsbury | Porsche 3.6L Flat-6 | 144 | 51 |
| 10 | 12 | Quarter Back | (Australia) Mark Eddy (Australia) Dean Grant | Ferrari 360 Challenge | 142 | 48 |
| 10 | 12 | Quarter Back | (Australia) Mark Eddy (Australia) Dean Grant | Ferrari 3.6L V8 | 142 | 48 |
| 11 | 19 | Nexus Cleaning; Roock; GPM | (Australia) Damien Flack (Australia) Ash Samadhi (Australia) Marc Cini | Porsche 996 GT3 Cup | 139 | 45 |
| 11 | 19 | Nexus Cleaning; Roock; GPM | (Australia) Damien Flack (Australia) Ash Samadhi (Australia) Marc Cini | Porsche 3.6L Flat-6 | 139 | 45 |
| 12 | 99 | Urban Arrangement | (Australia) Peter Lucas (Australia) Scott Bargwanna | Lotus Elise | 137 | 42 |
| 12 | 99 | Urban Arrangement | (Australia) Peter Lucas (Australia) Scott Bargwanna | Rover 1.8L I4 | 137 | 42 |
| 13 | 38 | World of Learning | (Australia) David Wall (Australia) Des Wall | Porsche 996 GT3-RSR | 130 | 39 |
| 13 | 38 | World of Learning | (Australia) David Wall (Australia) Des Wall | Porsche 3.6L Flat-6 | 130 | 39 |
| DNF | 23 | Pelorus Property Group | (Australia) Paul Tresidder (Australia) Max Twigg | Porsche 996 GT3 Cup | 79 | |
| DNF | 23 | Pelorus Property Group | (Australia) Paul Tresidder (Australia) Max Twigg | Porsche 3.6L Flat-6 | 79 | |
| DNF | 4 | Consolidated Chemical Company | (Australia) Ted Huglin (New Zealand) Craig Baird (New Zealand) Andrew Knight | Ferrari 360 GT | 21 | |
| DNF | 4 | Consolidated Chemical Company | (Australia) Ted Huglin (New Zealand) Craig Baird (New Zealand) Andrew Knight | Ferrari 3.6L V8 | 21 | |
| DNF | 54 | Natrad Radiators & Auto Air Conditioning | (Australia) Bryce Washington (Australia) Michael Trimble | Lamborghini Gallardo | 1 | |
| DNF | 54 | Natrad Radiators & Auto Air Conditioning | (Australia) Bryce Washington (Australia) Michael Trimble | Lamborghini 5.0L V10 | 1 | |
| DNS | 8 | Flash Air; Daikin Air Conditioning | (Australia) Peter Hill (Australia) Simon Middleton | Porsche 996 GT3-RSR | | |
| DNS | 8 | Flash Air; Daikin Air Conditioning | (Australia) Peter Hill (Australia) Simon Middleton | Porsche 3.6L Flat-6 | | |

== Statistics ==
- Pole position - #80 Sirena Racing - 1:11.5544
- Fastest lap - #38 World of Learning - 1:13.3227

== 2007 Australian Tourist Trophy ==
The 2007 Australian Tourist Trophy was awarded by the Confederation of Australian Motor Sport to the winners of the 2007 Sandown GT Classic. It was the eighteenth Australian Tourist Trophy, and the first to be awarded since 1979.

Australian GT Championship
| Previous race: 2007 Oran Park round of Australian GT Championship | 2007 season | Next race: None |
