= 1979 Australian Tourist Trophy =

Original club layout of the Winton Motor Raceway

The 1979 Australian Tourist Trophy was a motor race staged at the Winton circuit in Victoria, Australia on 28 October 1979. It was open to Group A Sports Cars and was recognized by the Confederation of Australian Motor Sport as an Australia Title. The race, which was the seventeenth Australian Tourist Trophy, was won by Paul Gibson, driving a Rennmax Repco.

== Results ==
Position	Driver	No.	Car	Entrant	Laps
1	Paul Gibson	3	Rennmax Repco	Adele Phillips	40
2	Stuart Kostera	2	Elfin MS7	Stuart Kostera	40
3	Grant Gibson	11	Rennmax Repco	Grant Gibson	40
4	David Richardson	66	Matich SR3A	David Richardson	40
5	Peter Jones		Cheetah Corolla	Speco-VHT Motor Products	39
6	Ross Wemyss		Allison Datsun	John Allison	39
7	A. Roberts		Roberts S2 Ford Cosworth FVA	A. Roberts	38
8	Dennis Burdon		Redwing Leyland	Dennis Burdon	36
9	William Dean		U2 Corolla	William Dean	35
10	Peter Beehag		Farrell	Peter Beehag	35

=== Race statistics ===
- Race distance: 40 laps, 57.7 miles, 81.2 km
- Pole Position: Paul Gibson
- Race time of winning car: 42.30.0
- Fastest lap: 61.1 - Paul Gibson & Stuart Kostera
- Number of starters: Not yet ascertained
- Number of finishers: Not yet ascertained
