= 1956 Australian Tourist Trophy =

The 1956 Australian Tourist Trophy was a 100-mile motor race for sports cars, staged at the Albert Park Circuit in Melbourne, Victoria, Australia on 25 November 1956. It was the first in a sequence of annual Australian Tourist Trophy races, each of these being recognised by the Confederation of Australian Motor Sport as the Australian Championship for sports cars. The race was won by Stirling Moss driving a Maserati 300S.

== Class Structure ==
Cars competed in five classes based on engine capacity:

- Open
- 2701 - 3000cc
- 1501 - 2700cc
- 1101 - 1500cc
- Up to 1100cc

Class awards were restricted to Australian residents only.

== Results ==
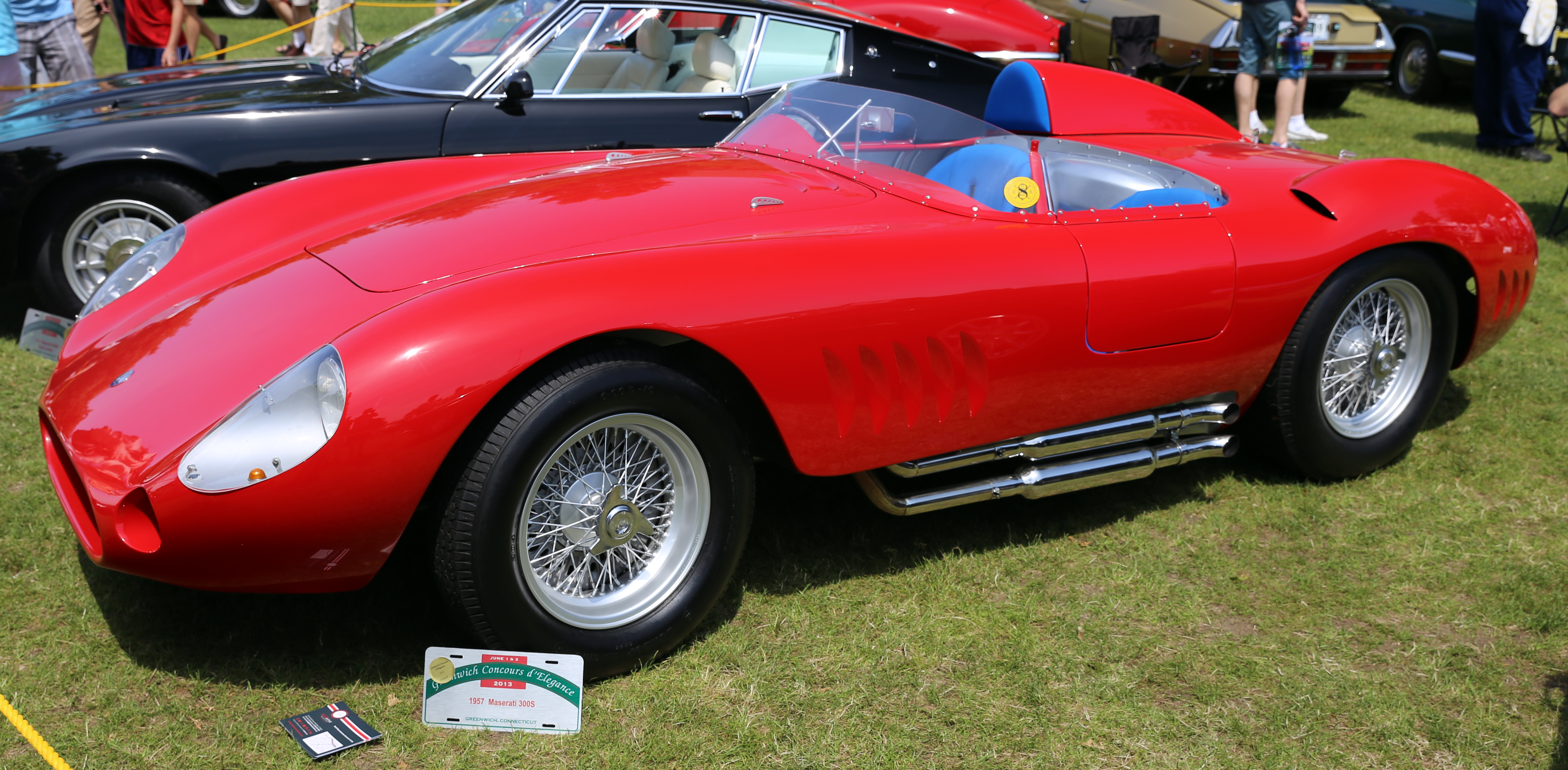
Stirling Moss won the 1956 Australian Tourist Trophy driving a Maserati 300S similar to that pictured above

| Position | Driver | No. | Car | Entrant | Class | Class pos. | Laps |
| 1 | Stirling Moss | 7 | Maserati 300S | Officine Alfieri Maserati | 2701 - 3000cc | N/A | 32 |
| 2 | Jean Behra | 6 | Maserati 300S | Officine Alfieri Maserati | 2701 - 3000cc | N/A | 32 |
| 3 | Ken Wharton | 10 | Ferrari 750 Monza | K Wharton | 2701 - 3000cc | N/A | 31 |
| 4 | Bill Pitt | 2 | Jaguar D-Type | Mrs G Anderson | Open | 1 | 31 |
| 5 | Bib Stillwell | 5 | Jaguar D-Type | BS Stillwell | Open | 2 | 31 |
| 6 | Peter Whitehead | 8 | Ferrari 750 Monza | PN Whitehead | 2701 - 3000cc | N/A | 31 |
| 7 | Lex Davison | 3 | HWM Jaguar | Ecurie Australie | Open | 3 | 29 |
| 8 | Ross Jensen | 18 | Austin-Healey 100S | R Jensen | 1501 - 2700cc | N/A | 29 |
| 9 | Tom Sulman | 14 | Aston Martin DB3S | T Sulman | 2701 - 3000cc | 1 | 29 |
| 10 | Ron Phillips | 20 | Austin-Healey 100S | JK & RK Phillips | 1501 - 2700cc | 1 | 28 |
| 11 | Jack Brabham | 35 | Cooper T39 Coventry Climax | Cooper Car Co Limited | 1101 - 1500cc | 1 | 28 |
| 12 | Paul England | 25 | Ausca Sports | PT England | 1501 - 2700cc | 2 | 28 |
| 13 | Derek Jolly | 38 | Decca Mk 2 Special | DE Jolly | Up to 1100cc | 1 | 27 |
| 14 | G Bailieu | 26 | Triumph TR2 Special | G Bailieu | 1501 - 2700cc | 3 | 27 |
| 15 | Colin Miller | 19 | Austin-Healey 100 | CW Miller | 1501 - 2700cc | 4 | 27 |
| 16 | Doug Whiteford | 23 | Austin-Healey 100S | D Whiteford | 1501 - 2700cc | 5 | 27 |
| 17 | Ray Gibbs | 17 | Austin-Healey 100 | RG Gibbs | 1501 - 2700cc | 6 | 27 |
| 18 | Keith Jones | 16 | Ferrari 225 S | N Sacilotto | 2701 - 3000cc | 2 | 27 |
| 19 | LJ Taylor | 43 | Austin-Healey 100 | LJ Taylor | 1501 - 2700cc | 7 | 26 |
| 20 | Barry Topen | 34 | MG TF | BD Topen | 1101 - 1500cc | 2 | 26 |
| 21 | HC Old | 31 | Porsche | Monaro Motors | 1101 - 1500 cc | 3 | 26 |
| 22 | Sam Miller | 22 | Austin-Healey 100S | SN Miller | 1501 - 2700cc | 8 | 25 |
| 23 | Ralph Snodgrass | 4 | Allard J2 | RW Snodgrass | Open | 4 | 25 |
| 24 | Jim Gullan | 39 | MG K3 s/c | J Gullan | Up to 1100cc | 2 | 24 |
| 25 | AC Newman | 33 | MG | AC Newman | 1101 - 1500 cc | 4 | 21 |
| DNF | Doug Chivas | 37 | Lotus Mk.6 Coventry Climax | DG Chivas | Up to 1100cc | | 24 |
| DNF | John Aldis | 1 | Cooper T33 Jaguar | JA Aldis | Open | | 19 |
| DNF | Stan Coffey | 9 | Ferrari 750A | Dowidat Spanner Distributors | 2701 - 3000cc | | 20 |
| DNF | Bill Coad | 24 | Vauxhall Special | WF Coad | 1501 - 2700cc | | 16 |
| DNF | WJ Clemens | 41 | Austin-Healey 100 | WJ Clemens | 1501 - 2700cc | | 8 |
| DNF | NF Price | 42 | Austin-Healey 100 | NF Price | 1501 - 2700cc | | 7 |
| DNF | AS Baker | 27 | Triumph TR2 | AS Baker | 1501 - 2700cc | | 7 |
| DNF | Otto Stone | 30 | Porsche | N McK. Hamilton | 1101 - 1500 cc | | 1 |
| DNF | Bill Patterson | 36 | Cooper Type 39 Coventry Climax | Bill Patterson Motors P/L | 1101 - 1500cc | | 1 |

=== Notes ===
- Race distance: 32 laps - 100 miles
- Starters: 34
- Winner's race time: 1h 3m 24.2s (94.6 mph)
- Fastest lap: Stirling Moss - 1:55.8 (97.15 mph) Sports car lap record
- First Australian driver: Bill Pitt
- Joseph Lucas Trophy (for driver of the first British car): Bill Pitt
