= Lotus 15 =

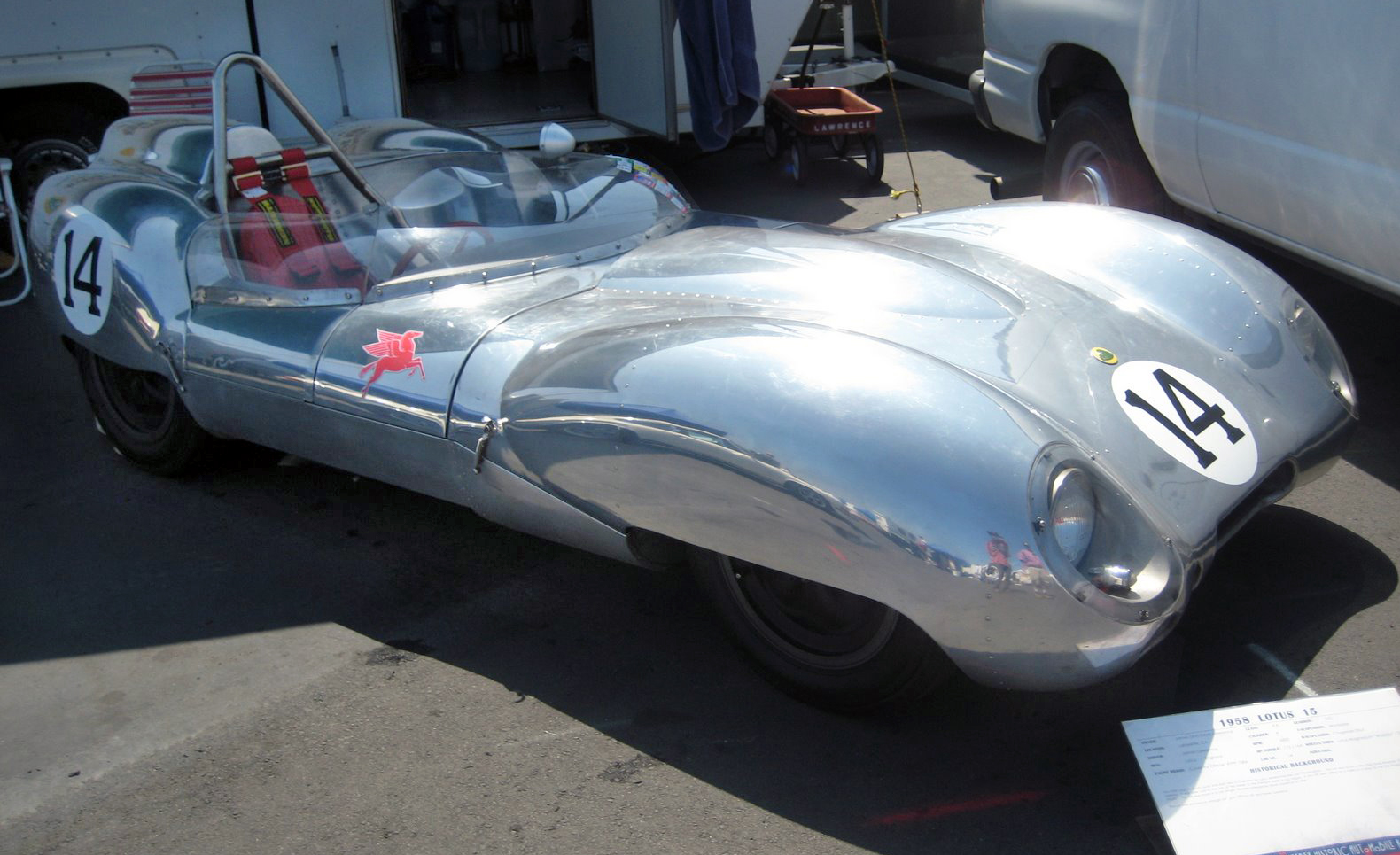

Overview
- Manufacturer: Lotus Engineering Ltd.
- Production: 1958–1960
- Designer: Colin Chapman

Body and chassis
- Class: Group 4 Sports Car
- Body style: Aluminium non-stressed
- Layout: Front engine, Rear wheel drive, 2-seater

Powertrain
- Engine: Coventry Climax FPF
- Transmission: Lotus "Queer Box" 5sp. BMC B-Series 4sp. ZF 5sp.

Dimensions
- Wheelbase: 88 in (2,235 mm)
- Length: 140.9 in (3,579 mm)
- Width: 60 in (1,524 mm)
- Height: 24 in (610 mm)
- Kerb weight: 992–1,240 lb (450–562 kg) (dry)

Chronology
- Predecessor: Lotus Mk.X
- Successor: Lotus 19

The Lotus 15 is a front-engine sports racing car designed by Colin Chapman of Lotus, built from 1958 until 1960.

== Series 1 ==
The 15 is a two-seater, front-engine, rear wheel drive sports racer with an aluminium body over a space frame configuration. As opposed to the six cylinder Bristol 2L engine in its predecessor Lotus Mk.X, the Mk.15 was designed with a dry-sump, all aluminium, DOHC four cylinder Coventry Climax FPF engine of 1.5 to 2.5 Litre displacement built for Formula Two and Grand Prix racing, mated to Lotus' own 5 speed sequential transaxle nicknamed 'Queerbox'. It was designed in 1957, and the production began in late 1957.

The spaceframe was similar to Lotus Eleven except for the Chapman strut rear suspension with inboard brakes and the accommodations for a larger engine, which included a slightly (7.5 degrees) tilted engine mounting space on the plan view, shifted to the right of the centerline in the front and left at the rear of the engine. This arrangement gave a larger space for the driver than the normally non-existing passenger.

The larger body of "English rolled" aluminum was also similar in appearance to the smaller and successful Lotus 11, with a major difference of a full-width windscreen, and the lower scuttle/screen height. Unlike the 11 which was designed by Frank Costin, the body design was a result of the collaboration between Chapman and the coachbuilder Williams & Pritchard.

It was available as a fully assembled form sans the engine at £2885, or as a kit of parts for £2395.

Lotus 15's debut was in Sussex Trophy at Goodwood on 7 April 1958 in the hands of Graham Hill who immediately set the lap record, but failed to finish the race due to a gearbox problem.

This constant mesh, sequential-shift, 5 speed gearbox combined with ZF limited-slip differential in the transaxle configuration was compact, light (85 lbs including inboard brakes and halfshafts) and quick shifting, but the reliability problem had been carried over from the F1 and F2 Lotus 12 single seater.

== Series 2 ==
Colin Chapman hired a young and talented gearbox engineer, Keith Duckworth, to solve this problem, but the priority needed to be on Lotus 16 for Grands Prix, which shared the Queerbox problem, so a newer version Series 2 was born while the update was in development in July, 1958 with BMC B-series four speed gearbox attached directly behind the engine, and a conventional differential housing with brake disc calipers mounted on the sides.

For the purpose of lowering the centre of gravity, the Climax engine was tilted about 28 degrees from vertical in the Series 1, which was found to cause engine lubrication issues, so it was mounted about 17 degrees from vertical on the Series 2. To clear the top of the engine, a larger bonnet bulge with front air scoop was incorporated on the body.

== Series 3 ==
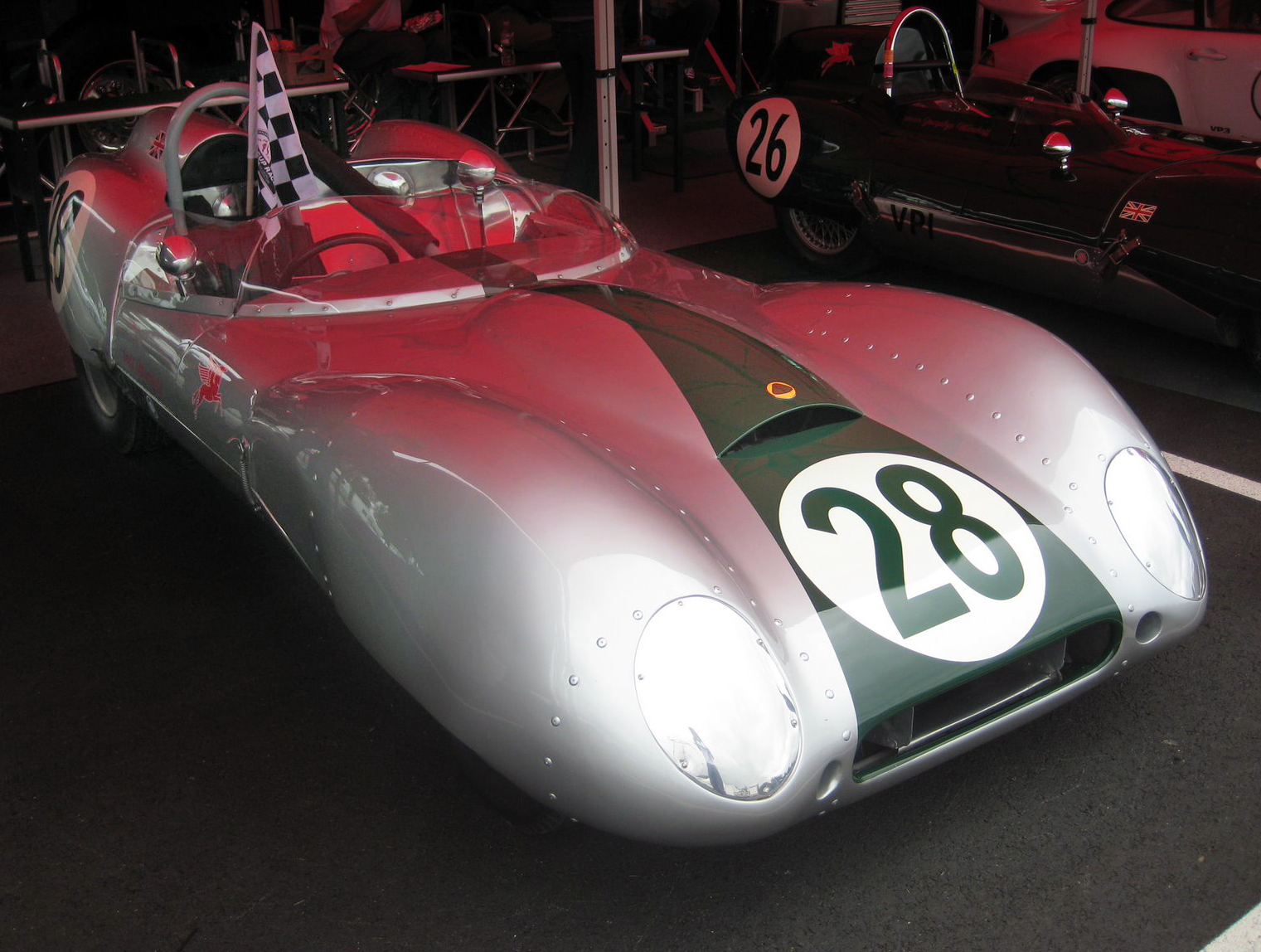
Lotus 15 Series 3. Note the air scoop in the middle of bonnet.

By the time the Series 3 was born in 1959, the Lotus transaxle had become more reliable thanks to the Duckworth redesign on its own dry sump lubrication system, but the young engineer pointed out the inherent limitation of the box in the amount of torque it can safely handle. So the Series 3 was offered with the Lotus 'Queer Box' transaxle for 1.5L FPF only, and BMC 4-speed or ZF 5-speed gearbox with a conventional differential for cars with a larger FPF.

The frame was reinforced in the areas that are deemed to be weak in Series 1 and 2, and the front suspension was upgraded from the previous configuration which had come directly from Lotus 11 Series 2.

== Engines ==
The larger 1.5L engine used for Lotus 11 was a bored and stroked FWB version of Coventry Climax FWA (which was an automotive conversion of a fire pump engine) with a compact SOHC cylinder head. In contrast, the FPF used on Lotus 15 were pure racing engines with a gear-driven DOHC head and dry sump.

1956 FPF 1475cc 4 cyl 3.20 x 2.80" 141 bhp (105 kW) at 7300 rpm
1957 FPF 1964cc 4 cyl 3.40 x 3.30" 175 bhp (130 kW) at 6500 rpm
1958 FPF 2207cc 4 cyl 3.50 x 3.50" Smaller block
1958 FPF 2467cc 4 cyl 3.70 x 3.50" 220 bhp (160 kW) at 6500 rpm Larger block

- The years denote version introduction. For details, see Coventry Climax article.
- Chassis number 15-619 is known to have raced with a Ferrari 500TRC 2L engine in the US in July, 1959.

== Race results ==
Other drivers beside Graham Hill who drove the 15 in period include Cliff Allison, Roy Salvadori, Jay Chamberlain, Pete Lovely, Innes Ireland, Alan Stacey, Mike Taylor, David Piper, Tim Parnell, David Buxton, Keith Greene, Derek Jolly, John Coombs, Peter Arundell, Peter Heath and Chuck Parsons with various levels of success. Derek Jolly won the 1960 Australian Tourist Trophy and Peter Heath was victorious in the 1961 Macau Grand Prix. However, the combination of a Grand Prix engine with the innovative Lotus transaxle generally did not provide a high level of reliability, so the 15 was never crowned with a major endurance title despite the impressive level of speed. It failed to finish the 1958 and 1959 24 Hours of Le Mans.

== Production ==
In total, about 28 Lotus 15 chassis are believed to have been made, including 9 Series 1 and 8 Series 2.
