= Buchanan (car) =

Australian automobile manufacturer

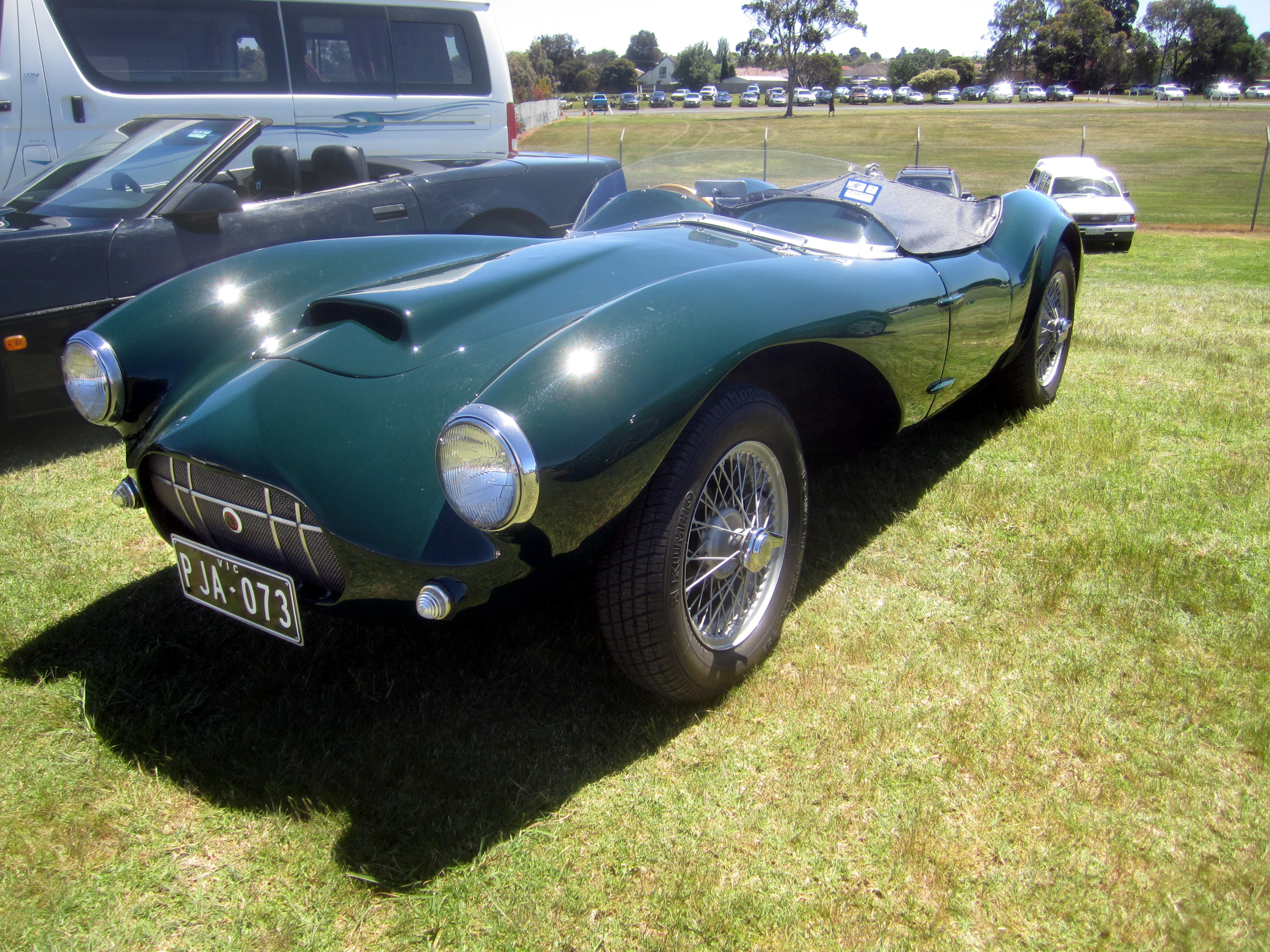
1960 Buchanan.

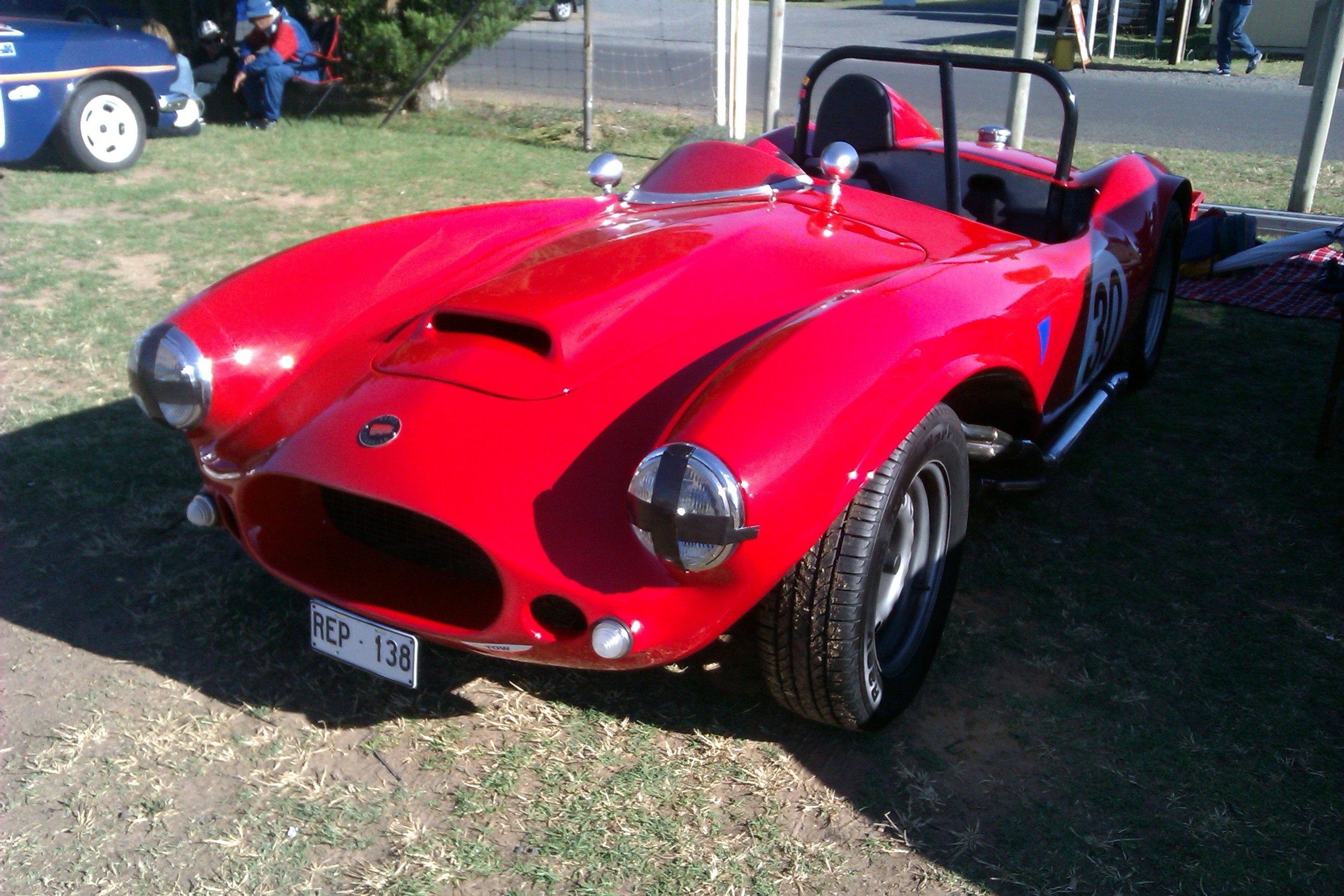
The Repco Ricardian, built in 1958, has a Buchanan body on a spaceframe chassis constructed by Albert Ludgate.

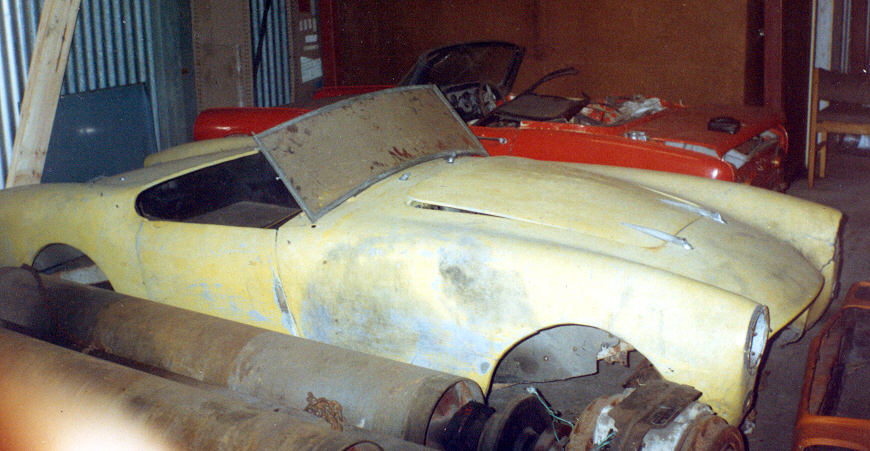
Buchanan Cobra #1 as photographed in 1993.

N H Buchanan Motor Co Pty Ltd was an Australian kit car manufacturer. It made sports cars in the 1950s.

The original body produced by Buchanan was a fibreglass item based on an Aston Martin DB3-S racing car. Buchanan borrowed a DB3-S and pulled moulds from it while it was in Australia. The styling was altered by filling in the scallops either side of the bonnet and reshaping the grille opening to be oval. Because the target market was for rebodying of early model MGs, the Buchanan moulds were cut and extended between the door openings and the rear wheelarches, adding several centimetres to the body length.

Racing car kits were also produced, consisting of this type of body plus a fabricated X-frame racing chassis manufactured from steel channel sections welded face to face to form box sections. The chassis used mechanicals from a Holden FJ, with the front suspension crossmember and rear axle assembly being shortened to suit the narrower body.

The Buchanan Cobra was introduced in 1958 as a production vehicle based on Standard 10 mechanicals. Only 7 were manufactured.

== Buchanan car list ==
Buchanan Cobra number 1 was known to be sitting in an industrial shed in Warners Bay awaiting restoration as at November 2006.

Buchanan Cobra number 3 is a complete running car and is raced through the Victorian Racing Register on a regular basis in Victoria as of May 2007. Attached is a current photograph of Cobra no.3 being raced at Sandown in November 2013. car is owned and driven by Paul Schilling a member of the Victorian Racing Register and residing at Healesville in Victoria. Cobra number 3 has recently undergone a facelift, an engine rebuild, a paint job, electrical sorting and has appeared at Phillip Island, Sandown, Briant Park and Rob Roy hillclimbs and 2014 could be a big year for this cobra..

"Wally Mitchell's" MGY-based Holden-powered Buchanan is currently undergoing a full ground up restoration by current owners Mathew Liersch and Clark Watson with an estimated completion date set for 2011.
