= Triumph TR2 =

British sports car produced between 1953 and 1955

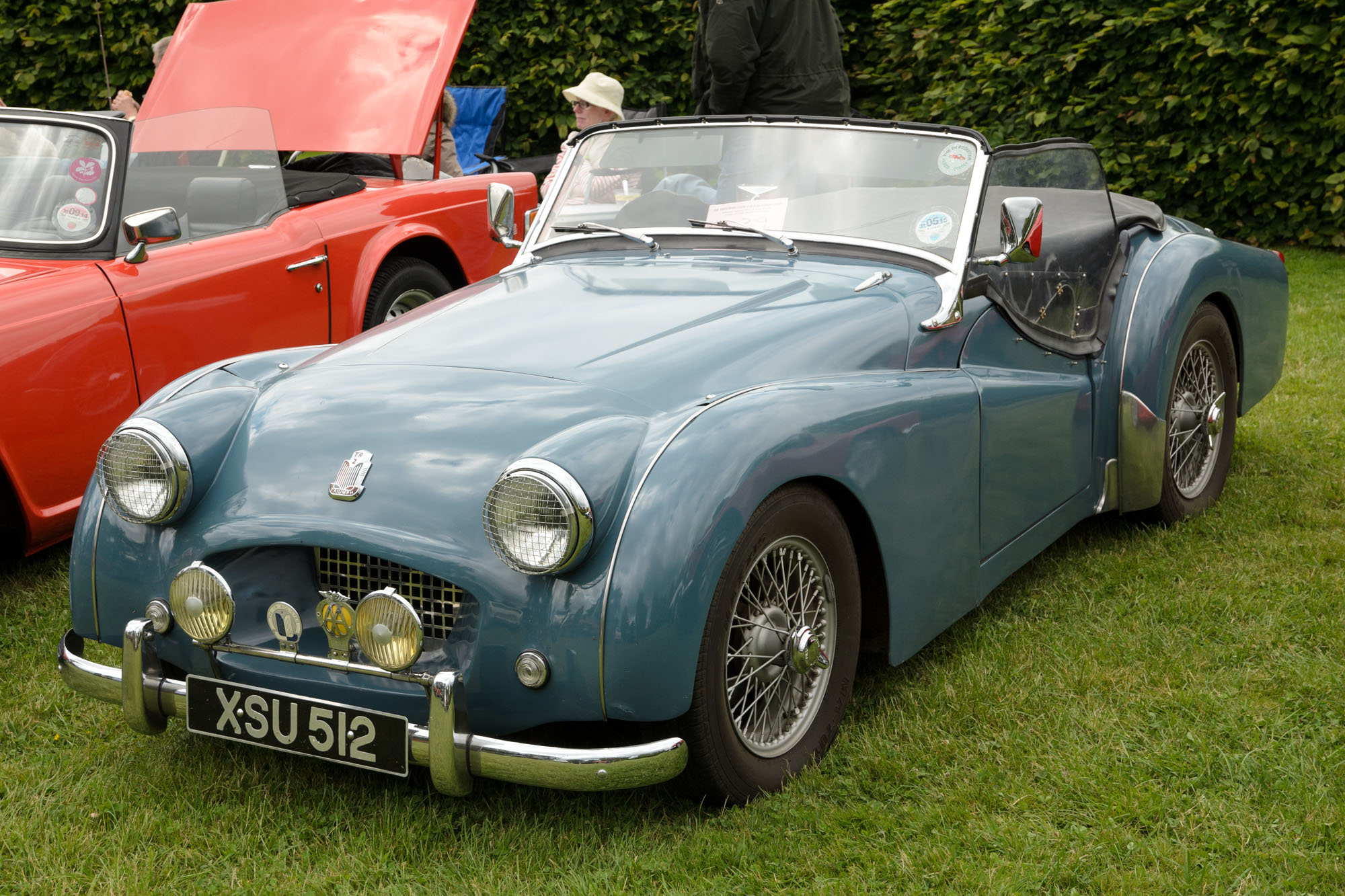

Overview
- Manufacturer: Standard Motor Company
- Production: 1953–1955
- Assembly: United Kingdom: Coventry

Body and chassis
- Class: Sports car

Powertrain
- Engine: 1991 cc I4
- Transmission: 4-speed manual

Dimensions
- Wheelbase: 88 in (2,235 mm)
- Length: 151 in (3,835 mm)
- Width: 55 in (1,397 mm)
- Height: 50 in (1,270 mm)
- Kerb weight: 2,100 lb (953 kg)

Chronology
- Predecessor: Triumph 20TS
- Successor: Triumph TR3

The Triumph TR2 is a sports car produced by the Standard Motor Company in the United Kingdom from 1953 to 1955. It was most commonly available in open two-seater form.

== History ==
Standard's Triumph Roadster was out-dated and under-powered on arrival. Company boss Sir John Black's attempt to acquire the Morgan Motor Company failed, but he still wanted an affordable sports car, so a prototype two-seater was built on a shortened Standard Eight chassis, powered by the Standard Vanguard's 2-litre straight-4. The resulting Triumph 20TS prototype was revealed at the 1952 London Motor Show.

Black asked BRM development engineer and test driver Ken Richardson to assess the 20TS. After he declared it a "death trap", a project was undertaken to improve the design; one year later the TR2 was unveiled. It had better looks; a simple ladder chassis; a longer body; and a bigger boot. It was loved by American buyers, and became the best earner for Triumph.

"TR" stands for "Triumph Roadster". Period advertising named the car T.R.2. A total of 8,636 TR2s were produced. In 1955 the more powerful TR3, with a re-designed grille and a GT package that included a factory hard-top, replaced it.

As of 2011 there were approximately 377 licensed and 52 SORN TR2s registered with the DVLA in the UK; in the United States 1,800 were known to survive.

== Features ==
The TR2 has a 1,991 cc (121.5 cu in) Standard wet liner inline-four engine from the Vanguard, fitted with twin H4 type SU Carburettors and tuned to increase its output to 90 bhp (67 kW). The body is mounted on a separate chassis with coil-sprung independent suspension at the front and a leaf-sprung live axle at the rear. Either wire or disc wheels could be supplied. The transmission is a four-speed manual unit, with optional top gear overdrive. Lockheed drum brakes are fitted all round.

== Performance ==
An overdrive-equipped car tested by The Motor magazine in 1954 had a top speed of 107.3 mph (172.7 km/h), and could accelerate from 0–60 mph (97 km/h) in 12.0 seconds. A fuel consumption of 34.5 miles per imperial gallon (8.2 L/100 km; 28.7 mpg_{‑US}) was recorded. The test car cost £900 including taxes and £56 for overdrive.

The magazine also commented that the TR2 was the lowest price British car able to exceed 100 mph (160 km/h).

Speed	Time	Time (overdrive version)
0–30 mph (48 km/h)	3.6 s	4.0 s
0–50 mph (80 km/h)	8.2 s	8.2 s
0–60 mph (97 km/h)	11.9 s	12.0 s
0–90 mph (140 km/h)	31.5 s	30.4 s

== Motorsports ==
While concentrating on the lucrative US sports car market, Standard-Triumph had given little thought to the competitive potential of their new TR2. Two events would address this oversight: the Jabbeke Tests, and early privateer rally victories.

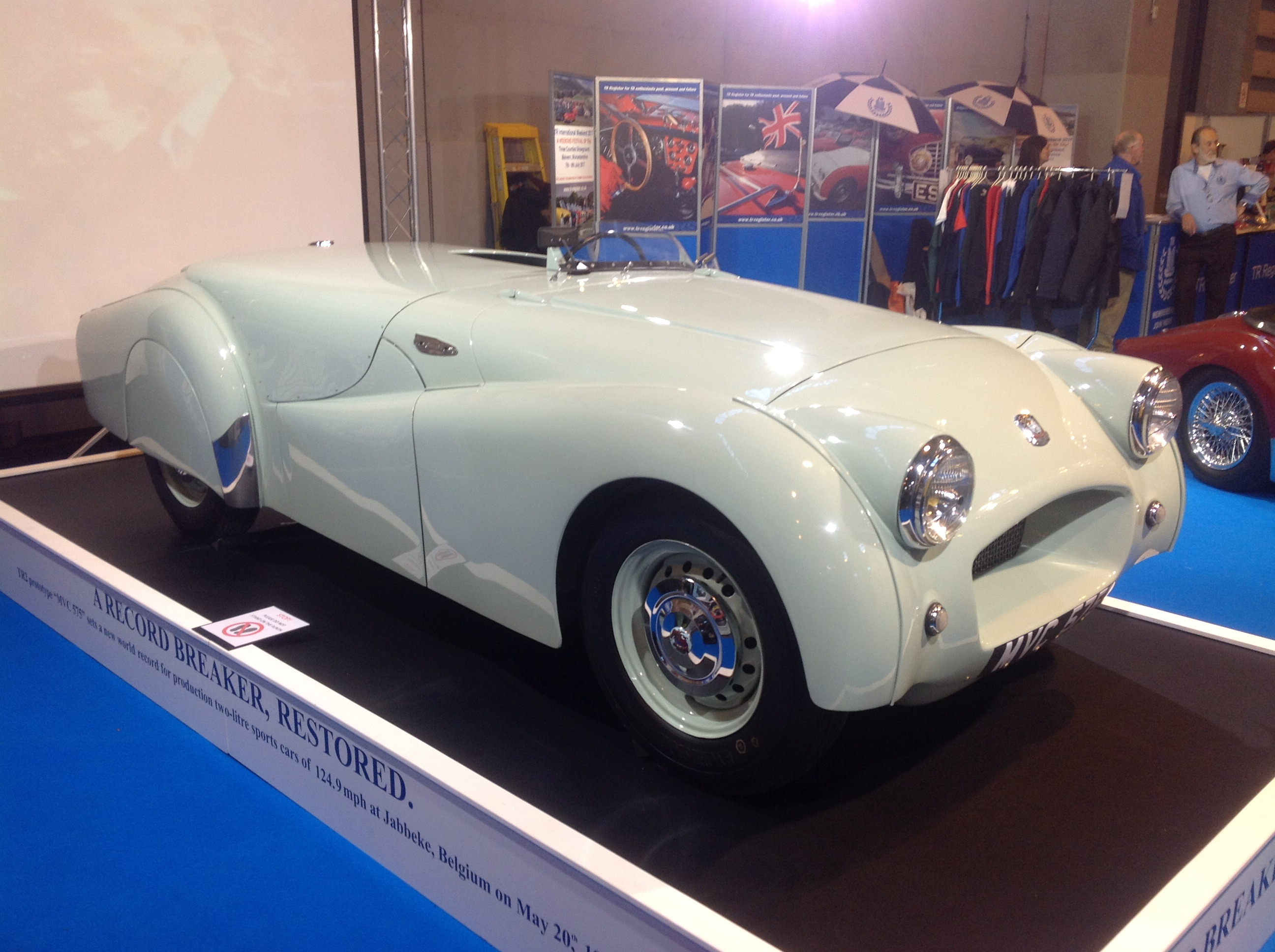
Jabbeke run streamlined TR2

Employing a production TR2 with optional streamlining equipment, labeled “Speedmodel” (Under-shield (Part #502122), Rear-wing spats, Metal cockpit cover), Triumph attained a speed of 124.889 mph on the closed Jabbeke motorway in Belgium in May 1953. The following March, customer TR2s took 1st, 2nd, and 5th places in the prestigious RAC Rally. The publicity derived from these accomplishments led the factory to establish a Competition Department under the leadership of Ken Richardson, supporting both works and customer cars.

Between 1954 and 1955, the TR2 was campaigned in the Mille Miglia, the Ulster TT at Dundrod, the Grand Prix of Macao, Lockbourne Races (USA), the Alpine, Monte Carlo, RAC, Thousand Island (Canada), Liege-Rome-Liege, Nigeria 24-Hour, 3rd ADAG Gruenewaldfahrt, Circuit of Ireland, Soleil-Cannes, RSAC, and Tulip rallies, among others, earning numerous Outright, Team, and Class awards including the coveted Coupe des Alpes.

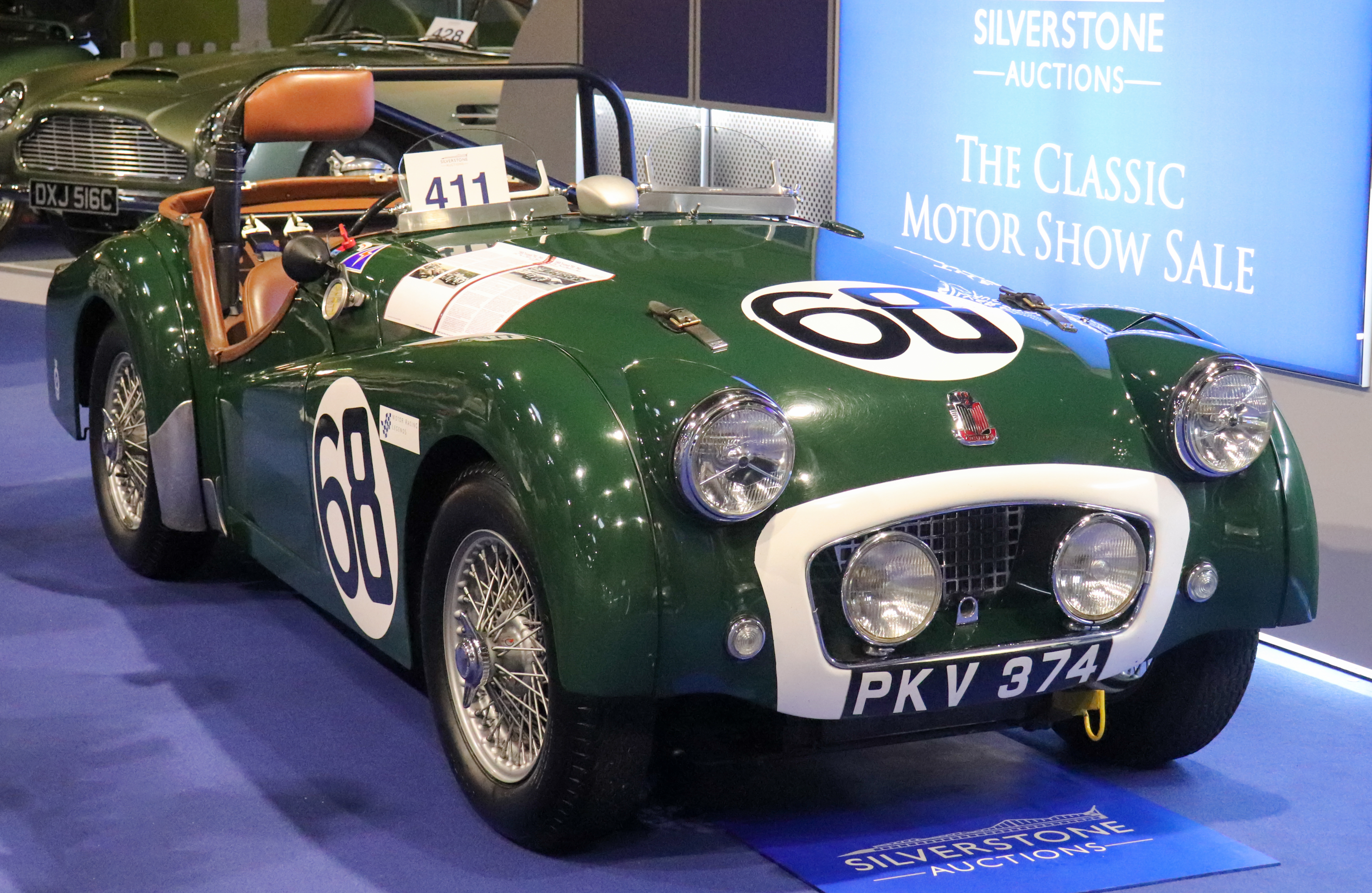
Le Mans TR2

In 1955, a Triumph works team of three TR2s modified with disc brakes, larger carburettors, and custom perspex Aeroscreens were entered in the 24 Hours of Le Mans. Reaching speeds of up to 120 mph (193 km/h) on the Mulsanne Straight, the team completed the race in 14th, 15th, and 19th positions. These cars' Girling disc brakes and uprated carburettors would later appear on the Triumph TR3.

Doug Whiteford won the 1955 Moomba TT at the Albert Park Circuit in Victoria, Australia driving a Triumph TR2.

== Coupé Francorchamps ==
The Triumph TR2 Coupé Francorchamps is a coupé version of the TR2 built in Belgium.

Belgian car company Impéria Automobiles resumed production in the post-World War II era by assembling cars from other manufacturers under license. These included Adler and, beginning in 1949, Standard-Triumph, first with the Standard Vanguard, and later the TR2. Impéria eventually built about 500 TR2s from Complete Knock Down (CKD) kits in their factory at Nessonvaux near Liège. All Belgian-built Triumphs had an "N" suffix added to their commission numbers.

In 1954 the company obtained Standard's permission to develop a coupé version of the TR2. The new model was designed by Impéria's Frans Pardon. The car, named for the Belgian Circuit de Spa-Francorchamps, debuted at the 1955 Brussels Motor Show. One year later, a Coupé Francorchamps appeared on Triumph's own stand at the same show.

Pardon created a fixed head coupé body with a glass backlite and a large transparent Perspex panel in the roof. The increased amount of side glass, and the clear roof panel made the interior prone to becoming uncomfortably warm.

Pardon's revisions extended beyond simply adding the roof. The design added new doors that include wind-down windows and external handles and locks. There is also a locking handle on the boot lid. To ease access to the interior, some cars have the B-pillar moved 8 cm (3.1 in) rearwards. A mix of long-door and short-door cars were built. Additionally, the steering wheel is moved closer to the car's centreline, and the floor is lowered, both by 2 cm (0.8 in). All cars are left-hand drive.

Available options included an overdrive, radio, wire wheels, 2-speed windshield wipers, and a wooden steering wheel. The overdrive is cable operated rather than electric, resulting in two shift levers in the interior - one for the four-speed manual transmission, and one for the overdrive, which can be engaged in any forward gear.

The changes made the car 62 kg (137 lb) heavier than a TR2 open two-seater.

The car was built from mid-1954 to mid-1955 primarily for the Belgian market, with only 22 produced.

Impéria closed their factory in 1958, and Triumph subsequently opened their own Belgian assembly plant.
