= Cooper T38 =

British sports car

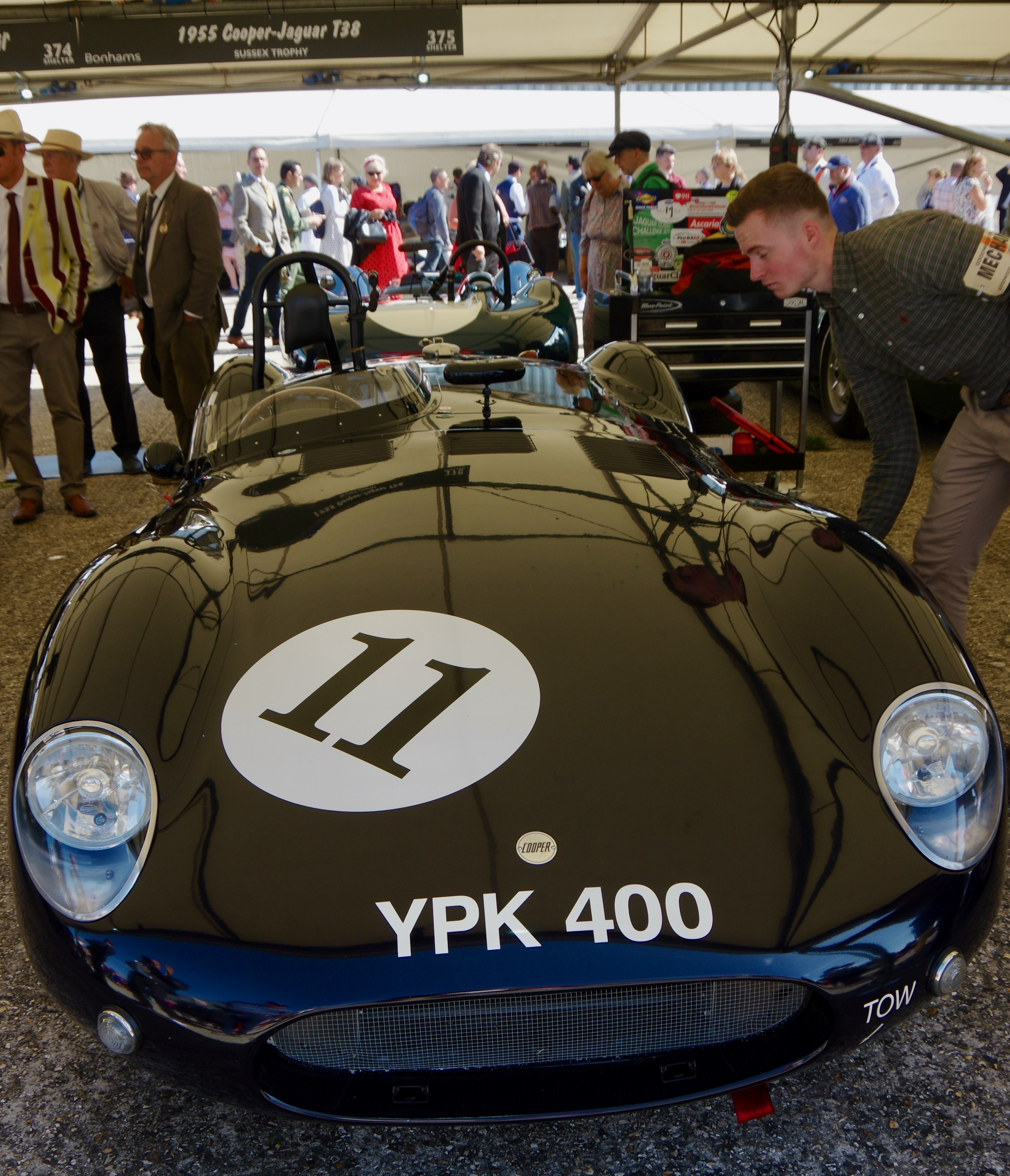
1955 Cooper-Jaguar T38

The Cooper T38, also known as the Cooper-Jaguar, was a lightweight sports car designed and developed by Cooper Cars for motor racing in 1955. It was entered in the 1955 24 Hours of Le Mans, driven by Peter Whitehead and Graham Whitehead, but retired after only 3–4 hours due to engine problems and an oil leak. It did not score any wins in 1955, although it achieved one podium at the end of the season. Between 1956 and 1962, it scored nine wins and clinched 23 podium finishes, with six victories alone being achieved at the Silverstone and Goodwood Circuits. It was powered by the 250 hp (190 kW), 3.4-litre, XK engine, which was also used in many Jaguar sports cars.
