= Cecil Plains Airfield =

Cecil Plains Airfield Heavy Bombardment Field No. 2
- Cecil Plains, Queensland in Australia
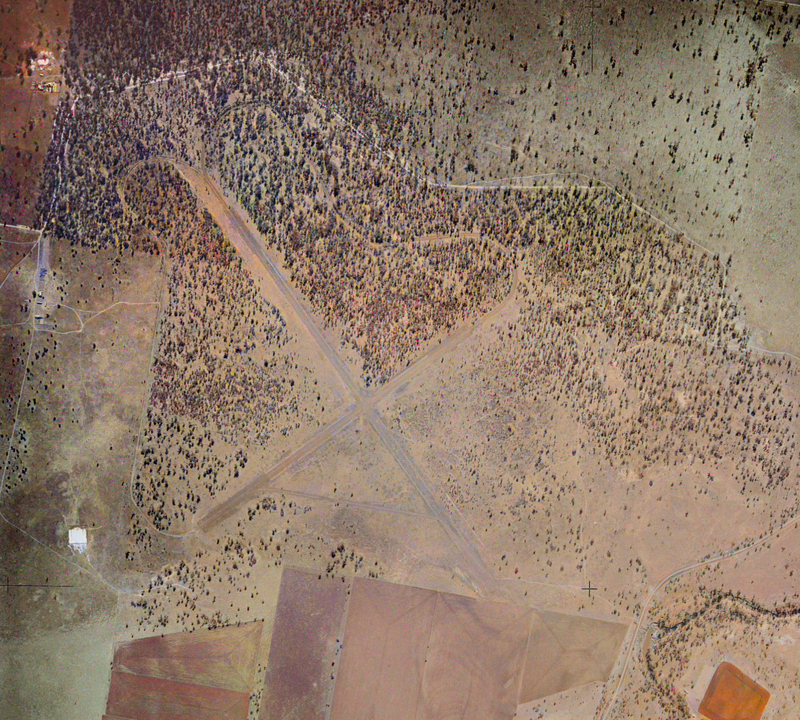
- A colorized aerial photograph depicting Cecil Plains Airfield, taken on 1 June 1959.

Site information
- Type: Military airfield
- Owner: Australian Air Board; Australian Defence Force
- Operator: Royal Australian Air Force

Location
- Shown within Australia Cecil Plains Airfield (Australia)
- Coordinates: 27°27′43″S 151°12′33″E

Site history
- Built: 1942
- Built by: Allied Works Council
- In use: 1944 - 1945
- Fate: Abandoned
- Battles/wars: Pacific War

Garrison information
- Occupants: No. 12 Squadron RAAF; No. 102 Squadron RAAF

Cecil Plains Airfield, also known as Tipton Airfield or Heavy Bombardment Field No. 2, was a military airfield located in Cecil Plains, Toowoomba Region, Queensland in Australia. It was established in 1942 as one of four inland all-weather airfields intended for bomber usage and remained unoccupied until 1944.

== History ==
In late March 1942, the Royal Australian Air Force requested the Department of the Interior to construct an airfield at Cecil Plains, located west of the Condamine River. By early April, the Queensland Main Roads Commission was still awaiting instructions regarding the construction of Cecil Plains Airfield and three other bomber airfields in Leyburn, Brymaroo and Condamine.

The site was not favoured due to number of dead trees, which measured up to 100 feet high, and mainly covered the area intended for the airfield, extending from south to west. However, the removal of the trees would leave grub holes, and were ever filled or compacted. There was labour available for clearing, however there was an insufficient number of trucks for gravelling. Construction of the airfield was organised in the order of clearing and levelling one runway, constructing the second runway for service, clearing the north-southern area and constructing taxiways, completing the first runway for service, and completing taxiways and disposal. On 20 March 1942, G.O. Officer Higginson from RAAF Base Amberley inspected the site.

=== Construction ===
On 4 May 1942, leveling and clearing works on a single strip were underway. By 15 May, a northwest–southeast runway was cleared and was serviceable for use, while formation graveling of the second northeast–southwest runway was underway. It was organized that the second runway was to be graveled first after clearing, and then the first runway would be graveled afterwards. This allowed constant operations for aircraft during construction. Runway construction was facilitated by the Allied Works Council. Taxiways were graveled to the width of 15.2 meters and were equipped with 10.6-meter-wide aircraft hideouts. The western taxiway was equipped with 6 aircraft hideouts, while the eastern taxiway was equipped with 10. The aircraft hideouts were sheltered with a sling type, steel cable-supported camouflage net. In late 1942, voluntary labour in Dalby helped pre-garnish netting with steel wool, and the material would also be used for dummy trees. By 1 July, the northwest–southeast runway was fully graveled and was serviceable by 18 July. In July 1942, the need for an access road to the site from Darby Road was still requires. The campsite for the airfield was located east of the runways, near gravel pits. During early October, construction of a mess building had begun. The camp was mostly completed by late December, and a weir was built across the Condamine River. In August 1942, operations to seal the two runways with bitumen commenced, with sealing in progress by June 1943. In December 1942, two more aircraft hideouts on the western taxiway were requested and installed.

==== Operation ====
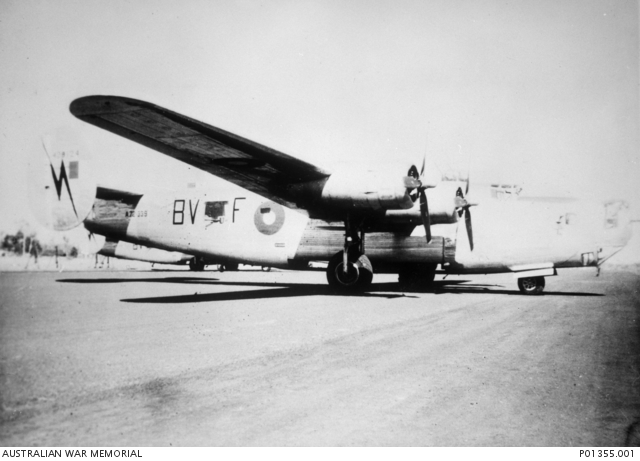
A No. 102 Squadron, RAAF, B24 Liberator bomber on the tarmac at RAAF Station Cecil Plains.

At the time, Cecil Plains Airfield was intended for usage by the United States Army Air Forces' heavy bombers as an all-weather airfield to launch bombing missions if the Japanese were to launch an invasion near Brisbane. However, as the Japanese never invaded Queensland, there was no need for US usage. Cecil Plains Airfield was left unoccupied until late 1944. In July 1943, the airfield was listed as one of 7 unoccupied airfields in Queensland, with buildings and services for 450 personnel. By 5 December 1944, some dispersal shelters had partially collapsed, and two 12,000 gallon fuel tanks were installed underground.

By March 1945, the hardstands were overgrown, and the taxiways remained in good condition despite limited use. Soon after the No. 12 Squadron RAAF had departed in May 1945, the No. 102 Squadron RAAF was organized at the airfield, and the squadron's B-24s, Avro Anson and Tiger moth arrived by July. The Mobile Cinema Unit No. 6 (Q), operated by the State Welfare Institute, Australian Comforts Fund was stationed at Cecil Plains Airfield. It had a mobile open-air screen for personnel of the No. 62 Squadron RAAF, providing entertainment and morale support. By the end of World War II, the unit never saw active duty, although 9 of its aircraft flew over Brisbane on 16 August 1945, to celebrate the end of the war. At the time, both runways were reported to be in good condition.

=== Post-war ===
On 31 December 1946, the RAAF transferred control of Cecil Plains Airfield to the Department of Civil Aviation on a permissive occupancy basis, allowing the DCA to maintain the airfield. On 1 May 1948, the DCA determined that it no longer required the airfield and returned control to the Department of Air. On 6 May 1948, the Commonwealth Disposals Commission declares all RAAF assets at Cecil Plains Airfield surplus, with sale for removal to be processed. Subsequently, the former mess building was sold via the commission, allowing it not to be included in grazing property. On 9 June 1948, Cecil Plains Airfield was retained for strategic necessity, but was unmaintained and could be leased. In case of reactivation, the airfield's already-existing gravel infrastructure could be utilized for resurfacing.

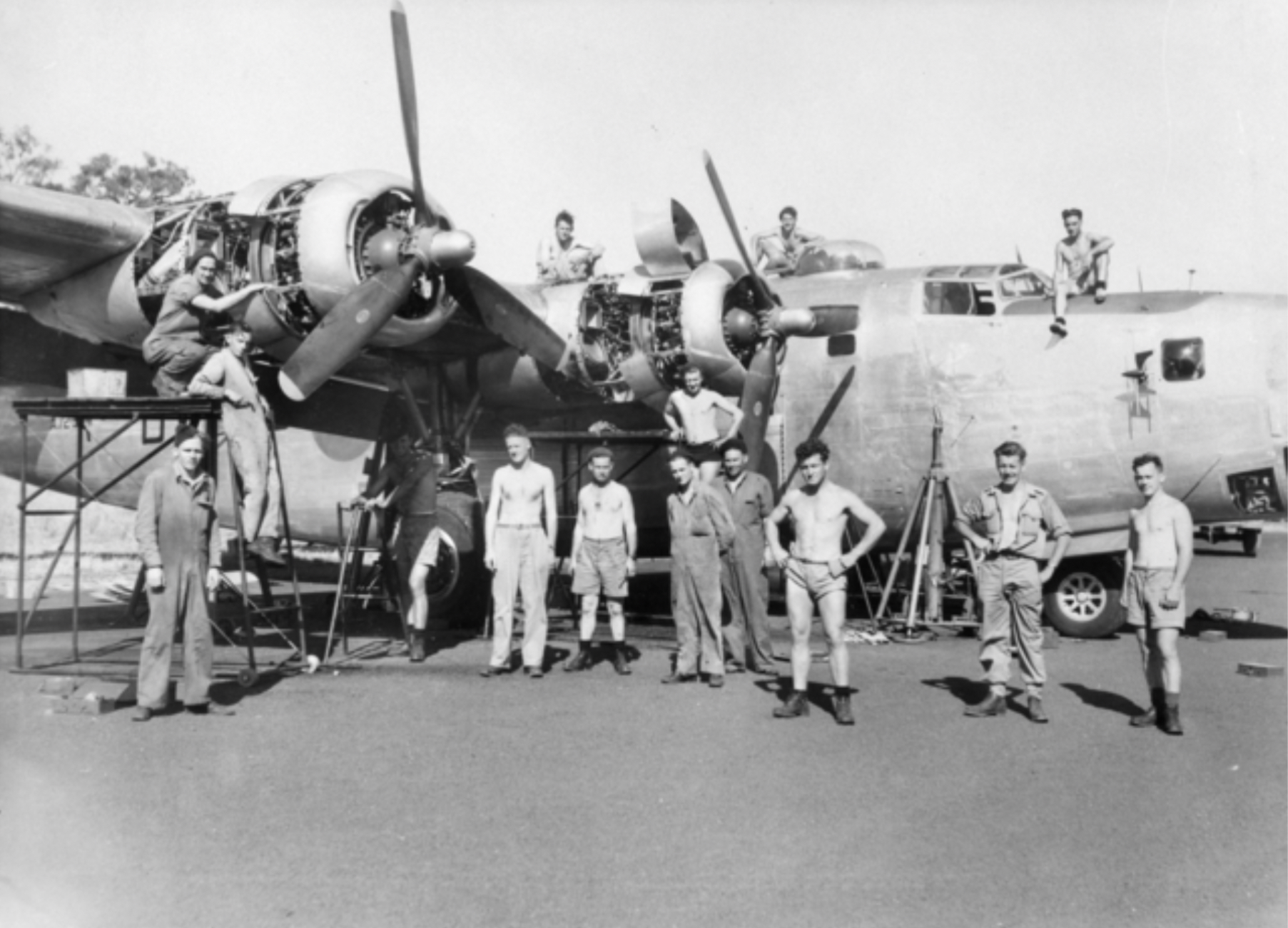
No. 102 Squadron, RAAF, Liberator B24 bomber undergoing a 200 flying hours inspection at RAAF Station Cecil Plains.

==== Re-development ====
From 30 June 1946 until 31 May 1947, William Henry Cook leased the airfield from the Department of Air with the purpose of grazing sheep only. Water tanks, a pumping engine, and troughs were installed. As the lease ended, the DCA assumed maintenance. However, Cook still had sheep grazing on the land and was asked to remove them. Mr F. Jurgs was appointed as an unpaid caretaker for minor maintenance duties of the former airfield. Grazing rights were considered to Jurgs as he previously assisted the department, and W. H. Cook who was previously leased. A lease was granted to Cook for 5 years from 27 September 1948, for grazing purposes only. The aerodrome originally included a Quarry Reserve (Camping Reserve R.21, Parish of Weale), which was Crown Land owned by the State of Queensland. Jondaryan Shire Council had historically used this quarry for road-making gravel. After the aerodrome was closed, the Shire attempted to continue using the quarry, however, Cook denied access. By 12 February 1951, the former quarry was partly filled with debris and rubbish, prompting the Shire to request a 5-acre site for a new quarry located north-east of the airfield.

A surplus RAAF building at Cecil Plains Airfield was purchased by the Department of the Interior for temporary use as a post office in Dalby and had a removal value of £490. The Dalby Hospitals Board, needing urgent hospital accommodation, requested a 144 x 25’ portion of the building for their use.

On 27 January 1949, the department requests approval for sale to Dalby Hospital Board at a price of £300, with ministerial approval by 12 May. On 23 May, the board was instructed to forward cheque and ensure any fences that were removed during relocation were re-erected. Two days later, the board complied and paid the £300, with formal authorization by 30 May. An inspection in April 1950 confirmed that the building was removed and that the site was left in satisfactory conditions.

On 1 March 1951, Frank Wolski was reported to be removing two truckloads of gravel off of a former runway from the aerodrome without permission, claiming possession of authorisation. On his second truckload, Wolski was stopped by Cook. A day later, Wolski returned and took another load of gravel. On 6 March 1951, Memorandum Reference QL.349 began investigation into the gravel removal. On 14 March 1951, Surveyor & Property Officer T.B. Payne reported the incident to the Department of Air. On 27 March 1951, A.G.W. Anderson, District Forester reported that Wolski held a quarry license for Camping Reserve 21, and that the gravel was rather taken from the reserve—not Commonwealth aerodrome land.

==== Bombing range proposal ====
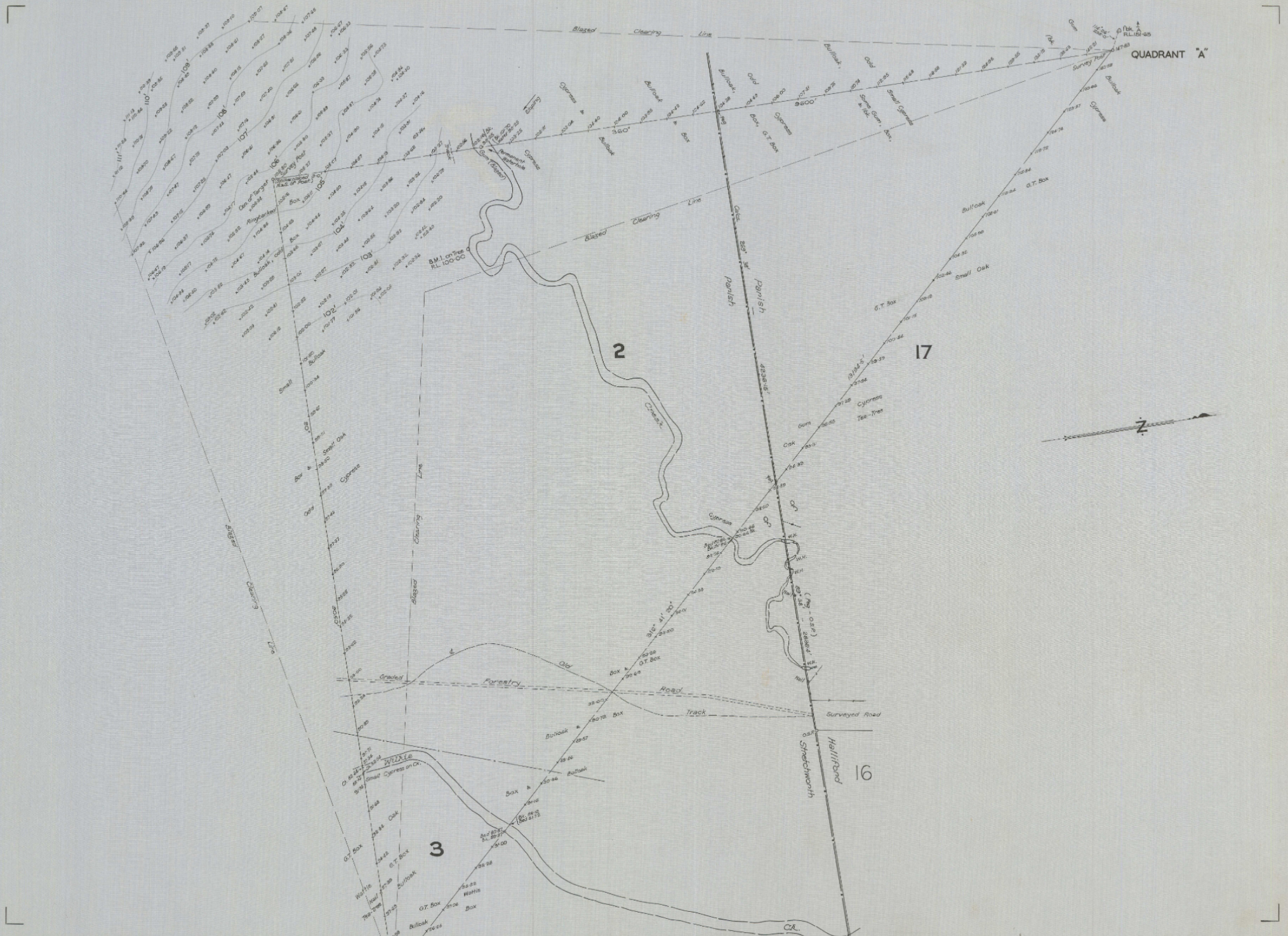
Plan of a proposed RAAF practice bombing range in Cecil Plains, 1961.

RAAF Amberley sought a new bombing range to replace the current bombing range at Evans Head. In 1961, a survey was conducted at a proposed site at Cecil Plains. The survey concluded that the site was suitable, requiring the clearing of 750-780 acres and tower construction at two quadrant sites. However, in June 1962, Phillips Petroleum intended oil drilling in the vicinity, with both the State and Phillips opposing the bombing range while petroleum exploration was active. On 19 September 1962, Acting Prime Minister William Henry Spooner notified that the bombing range proposal was removed from RAAF plans due to oil prospecting and urban growth.

== Present ==
After the war, Cecil Plains Airfield remained entirely abandoned. Today, the two intersecting runways and taxiways are still visible in satellite imagery, with all wartime buildings removed since then.

== Units ==
The following lists the units that were based at Cecil Plains Airfield:

RAAF

- No. 12 Squadron RAAF, 19 December 1944 - Late April 1945, equipped with Vultee Vengeance and later B-24 Liberator bombers
- No. 102 Squadron RAAF, end of May 1945 - December 1945, equipped with B-24 Liberators

Support

- Mobile Cinema Unit No. 6 (Q), 1945

== See also ==
- No. 102 Squadron RAAF
- Leyburn Airfield
- Gailes Airfield
