= Brymaroo Airfield =

Brymaroo Airfield Heavy Bombardment Field No. 1
- Brymaroo, Queensland in Australia
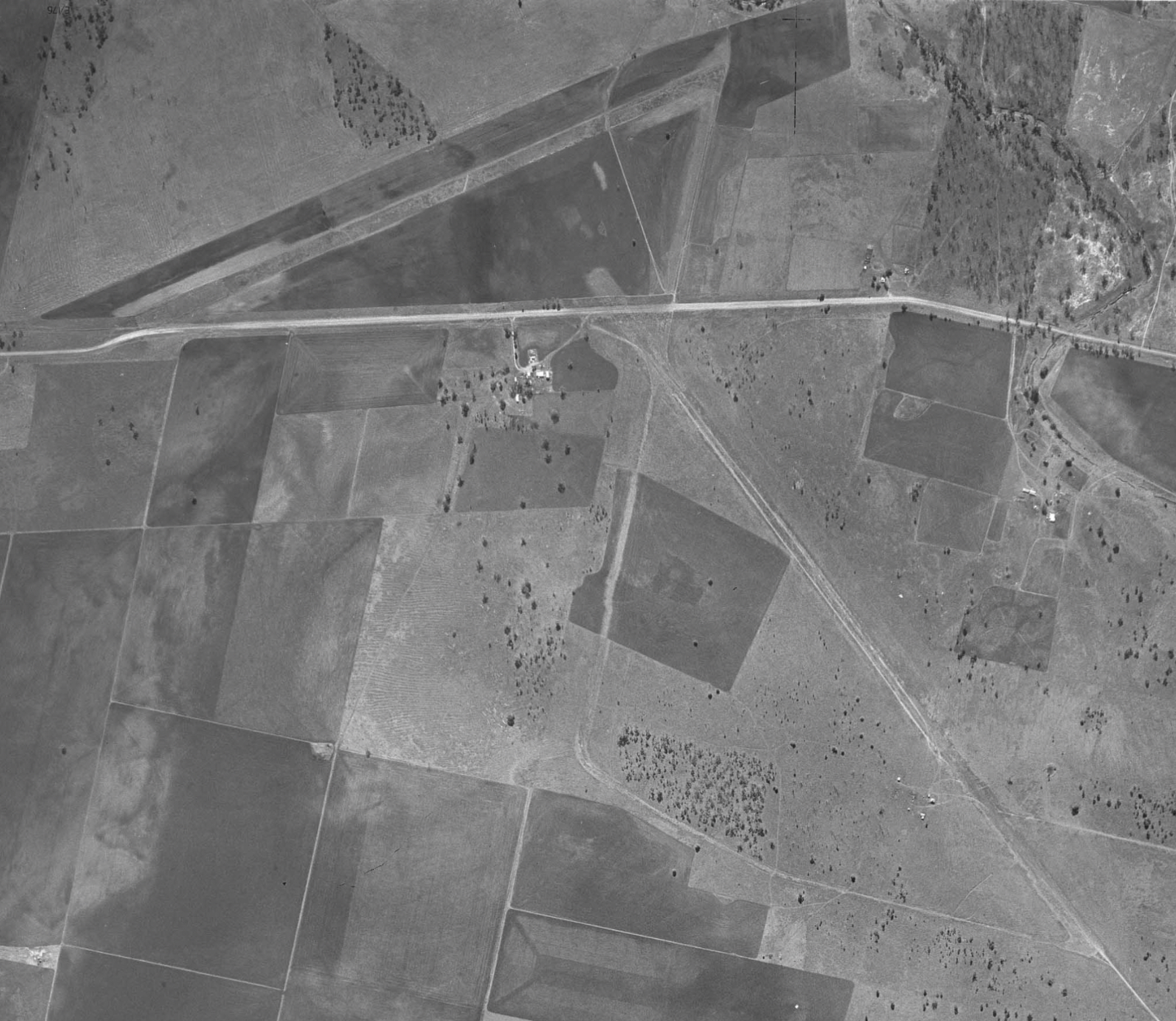
- An aerial photograph depicting Brymaroo Airfield, taken during run 8 on 1 June, 1959.

Site information
- Type: Military airfield
- Owner: Australian Air Board; Australian Defence Force
- Operator: Royal Australian Air Force

Location
- Shown within Australia Brymaroo Airfield (Australia)
- Coordinates: 27°12′57″S 151°36′08″E

Site history
- Built: 1942
- In use: 1944 - 1945
- Fate: Abandoned
- Battles/wars: Pacific War

Garrison information
- Occupants: No. 99 Squadron RAAF

Brymaroo Airfield, also known as Jondaryan Airfield or Heavy Bombardment Field No. 1, was a military airfield located in Brymaroo, Toowoomba Region, Queensland in Australia. It was established in 1942 as one of four inland all-weather airfields intended for bomber usage, and remained unoccupied until 1945.

== History ==
On 18 November 1942, land was proposed for acquisition to construct Brymaroo Airfield near Brisbane, encompassing a mix of private and Crown land within the Parish of Rosalie. The parcels included properties owned by C.E.E. Wockner, A.M. Wockner, E. Price, C.F. Gentner, J.T. & S.E. Gatfield (later Cyril Thomas Biggin), R.J.R. Winten, and P.J.T. & G.S. Jeffrey & E.M. Oom, as well as several reserves and easements. On 8 January, 1943, the site selection was reviewed and approved by the Central Hirings Committee, and the Department of Air proceeded with the acquisition for construction of the airfield. Subsequently, compensation was paid for the landowners.

=== Construction ===
Brymaroo Airfield began construction, comprising 862 acres of land. It was designated as Heavy Bombardment Field No. 1. Two thinly sealed runways were laid, while 18 slung type hideouts were constructed by early 1943. A satellite field for the airfield was proposed at Irvingdale, however, it was never built. At the time, Brymaroo Airfield was intended for usage by the United States Army Air Forces' heavy bombers as an all-weather airfield to launch bombing missions if the Japanese were to launch an invasion near Brisbane. In 1943, the Queensland Main Roads Commission demolished a bridge to construct an access road to Brymaroo Airfield. The local council was informed by the commission that they would not be paid any compensation for the bridge.

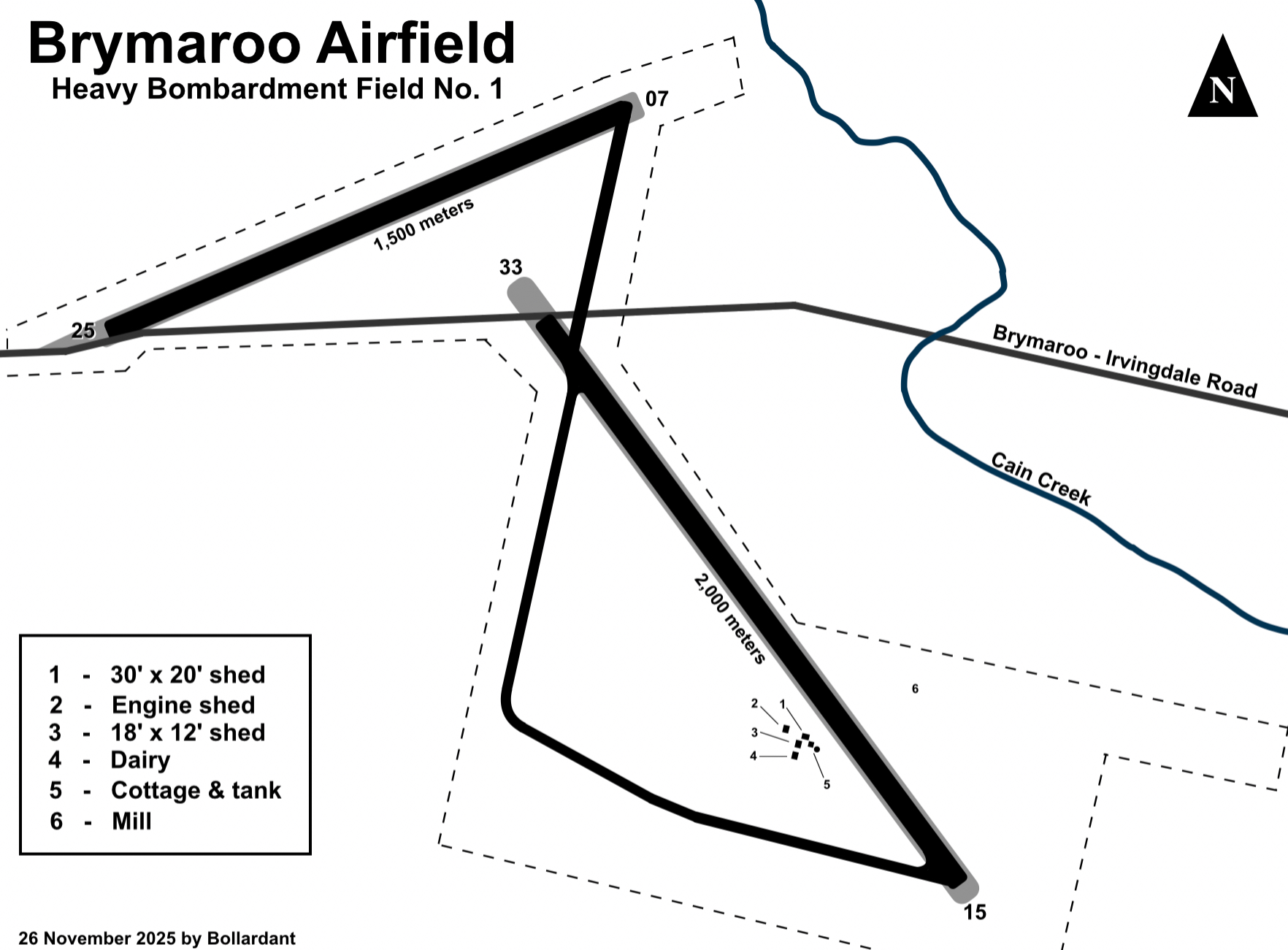
Map of Brymaroo Airfield

The airfield remained unused until 1945, when the No. 99 Squadron RAAF arrived from Leyburn Airfield with their Consolidated B-24 Liberators.

=== Present ===
On 28 February, 1987, the Alex Campbell Park was officially opened by Councillor Alick Williams, chairman of the Rosalie Shire Council, which commemorates the use of land near the park as an airfield being part of the 'Brisbane Line of Defence'. It was funded by residents of Brymaroo, Rosalie Shire Council, and the Australian Bicentennial Authority. Group Captain Arthur Barnes unveiled a plaque in Alex Campbell Park, Brymaroo, dedicated to commemorating the service of a RAAF Canberra Bomber displayed at the park. The aircraft was helped assembled by personnel from Oakey Army Aviation Base.

Recently, Oakey Army Aviation Centre has used the southeast portion of the 131 degree runway for training purposes, operating as a satellite. It has been used for routine training exercises by the Australian Army.
