= Landes de Bussac Airfield =

Former airfield in Landes de Bussac, France

Landes de Bussac Airfield
- Bussac-Forêt, Nouvelle-Aquitaine region in France
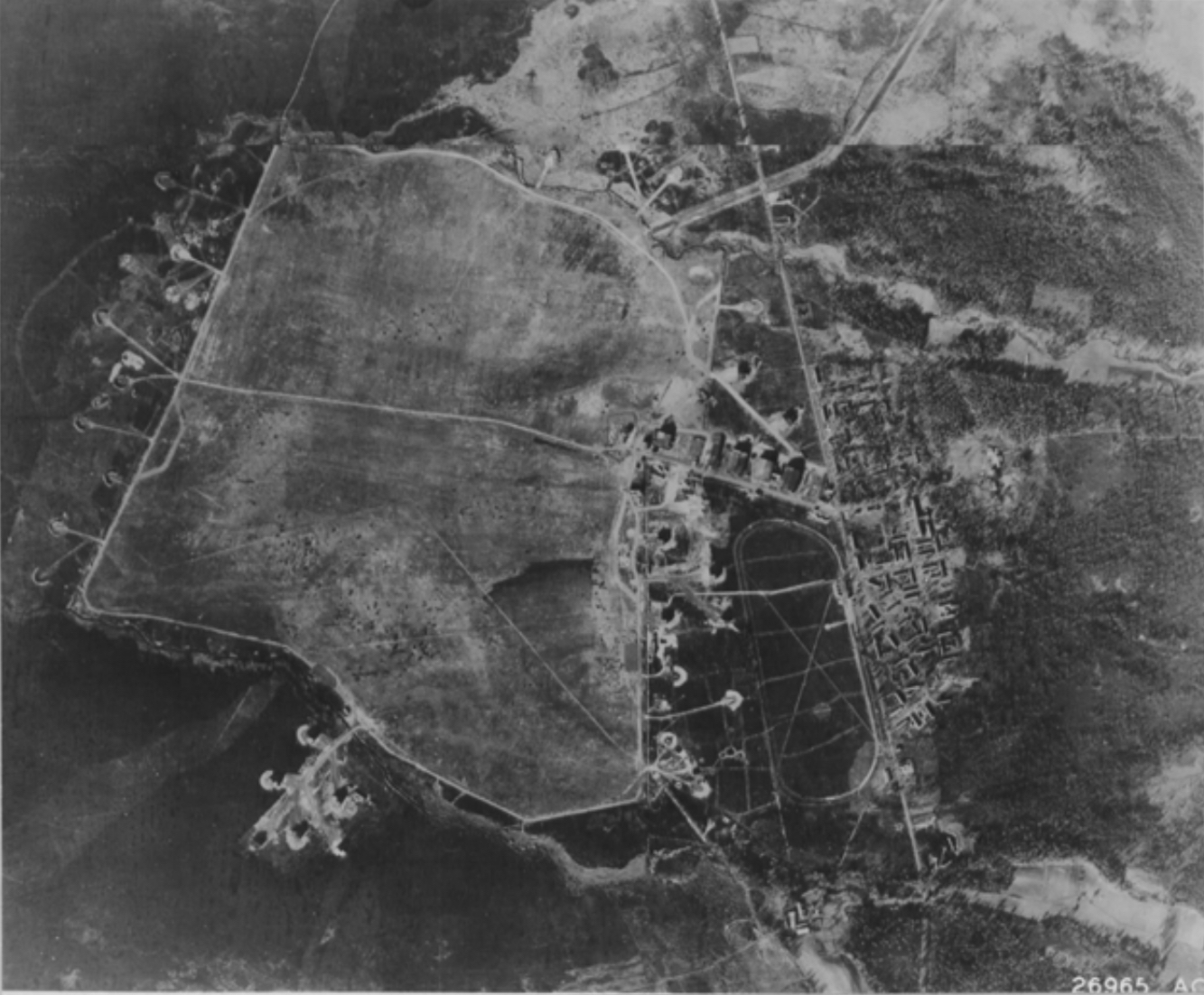
- Aerial photo of Landes de Bussac taken on 18 January, 1944, by a photographer of the 8th Bomber Command.

Location
- Coordinates: 45°11′45″N 00°20′50″W

Site history
- Built: June 1926
- In use: 1937 - 1953
- Demolished: 1970s
- Events: World War II

Landes de Bussac Airfield, also known as Bedenac-Bussac Airfield, was a military airport in the commune of Landes de Bussac (today Bussac-Forêt) in western France, located approximately 45 kilometres north northeast from Bordeaux. It was established in June 1926 and was closed in the early 1950s, mainly serving military operations.

== History ==
Landes de Bussac Airfield was established in June 1926 as an emergency landing ground for the region. The airfield was listed in the 1936 Michelin Guide to Aerodromes as Jonzac-Landes-de-Bussac, operating under the jurisdiction of the Bordeaux-Teynac Commandant. The airfield covered an area of 600 x 600 meters. It was also equipped with an eclipse beacon with a range of 25 km. In 1937, it was designated as Bédenac-Bussac State Aerodrome, mainly operating civil aviation. By September 1939, a comprehensive drainage network was complete. It had an area of approximately 160 hectares by 1939. It was later taken over and enlarged by the French military.

=== World War II ===
During World War 2, the German army captured Landes de Bussac Airfield and it was immediately put to use by the Luftwaffe. On 20 April 1941, 260 non-German workers were employed to construct the airfield. The station was not yet operational, and between 1940 and 1942, the airfield began to significantly be expanded. A taxi track was built around the airfield, along with dispersals. There were 2 dispersal areas located north and south and it totalled to 12 large covered aircraft shelters, and 10 large operant aircraft shelters by mid-1943. It consisted of 2 medium hangars and a small hangar on the northeast boundary. The main boundary of the airfield was equipped with lighting for night operations. A station headquarters, administration offices, dispensaries, and various barrack buildings were grouped together behind the hangars. Its nearest railway connection was in the town of Bussac. Landes de Bussac Airfield operated as an all-weather airfield, with a sandy heathland landing ground measuring approximately 1,190 by 1,000 meters. The airfield was primarily used as a fighter training base by the Luftwaffe, and was in preparation to becoming a fighter operations base.

In 1944, the Allies began bombing the airfield, making the Germans unable to destroy its facilities before recapture. On 21 March 1944, a low-level attack by the VIII Fighter Command’s North American P-51 Mustangs, destroying 2 Focke-Wulf Fw 190s, 1 Dornier Do 217, and 1 Junkers Ju 52. On 22 April 1944, the open aircraft shelters were replaced with covered shelters. Additionally, a third dispersal area in the north boundary was under construction. Landes de Bussac had a dummy airfield located 3.6 kilometres north north-west, named Les Jards.

On 19 June 1944, Landes de Bussac Airfield was targeted by the 1st Division Bomber Group. Subsequently, the 94th Combat Wing was tasked to send three complete wings to attack the base. The 9th A Combat Wing, consisting of 36 planes, flew third in the formations during the mission. The group’s flight path took them directly over Normandy beachhead, and weather conditions remained poor. However, they successfully bombed the airfield without encountering any enemy fighter opposition and light antiaircraft fire.

The Germans planned to decommission Landes de Bussac Airfield—by destroying it with bombs. However, they only had time to destroy a section of the main sewer system. Because of this, the airfield escaped complete destruction.

=== Units ===
The following lists the units that were based at Landes de Bussac.

Germany Army

- 4. (Heeres) Staffel / Aufklärungsgruppe 12, December 1940 – May 1941
- 7. (Heeres) Staffel / Aufklärungsgruppe 12, circa December 1940 – February 1941?
- Kurierstaffel 5, circa February / March 1941

Luftwaffe

- Elements of Ergänzungs-Jagdgruppe Ost (later Jagdgruppe Ost), September 1942 – June 1943
- 1. Staffel / Ergänzungs-Jagdgruppe Süd, October 1942 – March 1943
- 3. Staffel / (Ergänzungs-) Jagdgruppe West, February 1944 – May 1944

=== Post-war usage ===
In November 1946, the airfield was reinstated by the Armée de l'Air. Subsequently, it was assigned primarily for Air Force usage, and secondarily for air transport and light and sports aviation. It was opened to air traffic by ministerial decree on 6 February, 1947. The airfield was used daily by touristic aviation and gliders. In 1951, the US military requested the use of the airfield for non-aviation related purposes. It was to serve as an extension of its communication lines to and from Bordeaux. The Minister of Transport then made aviation operations in the airfield prohibited, and a request for the replacement of the airfield which was accompanied was unsuccessful. Subsequently, the US Army immediately began to construct an equipment and chemical depot, a barracks, ancillary installations, and a storage facility at the airfield. However, in doing so, they damaged the drainage to an extent that it was seen as easier to create a new airfield. Following this, a decision was made in 1953 to build the new Bordeaux-Saucats airfield.

In 1954, the 562nd Quartermaster Company from USA was stationed in Bussac, as a Petroleum Supply Mobile unit. It mainly managed fuel logistics, such as JP-3 fuel dumps and mobile petroleum support. During this operation, hundreds of jerry cans and 55 gallon drums were filled with JP-3 fuel. The First platoon of the 581st Engineer Company (Field Maintenance) was based in Chinon, with their camp based in Bussac. Additionally, the 313th Signal Company, a platoon of the 202nd Military Police Company, and elements of the 97th Engineer (construction) was based in Bussac. On 18 March 1955, the 106th Transportation Battalion was activated at Landes de Bussac. Units from the 37th Highway Transport Command also arrived. These units were a part of the early 1950s buildup of the US Army’s communications zone in France. Eventually, the former airfield became overgrown with weeds, with its buildings being repurposed for storage. Although the base was small, it was able to retain full amenities, which included a Base Exchange and a canteen operated by Polish Guards—former Allied servicemen who had fled Nazi occupation. The platoon of the 581st Engineer Company primarily repaired and maintained heavy construction equipment for their attached engineer battalion.

=== Present ===
When the Americans withdrew from Bussac in the 1960s, any aerial activity at the former airfield was still prohibited, and the airfield never reopened. By 1974, the field was completely dismantled. Today, aerial imagery shows no trace of the two former runways.
