= Bruce Bochy =

American baseball player and manager (born 1955)

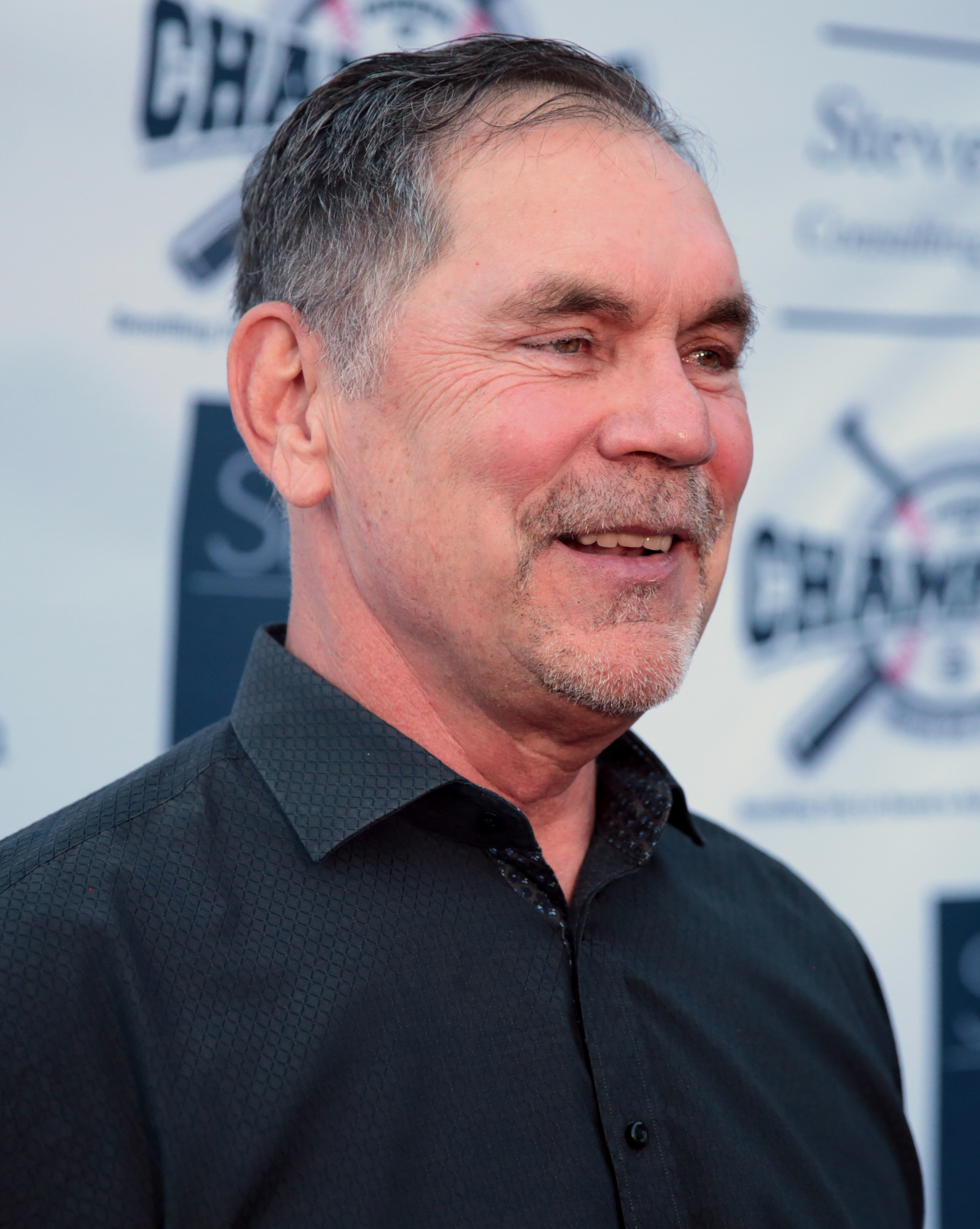
- Bochy in 2017
- Catcher / Manager
- Born: April 16, 1955 (age 71); Bussac-Forêt, France
- Batted: Right Threw: Right

MLB debut
- July 19, 1978, for the Houston Astros

Last MLB appearance
- October 4, 1987, for the San Diego Padres

MLB statistics
- Batting average: .239
- Home runs: 26
- Runs batted in: 93
- Managerial record: 2,252–2,266
- Winning %: .498
- Stats at Baseball Reference
- Managerial record at Baseball Reference

Teams
- As player: Houston Astros (1978–1980); New York Mets (1982); San Diego Padres (1983–1987); As manager: San Diego Padres (1995–2006); San Francisco Giants (2007–2019); Texas Rangers (2023–2025); As coach: San Diego Padres (1993–1994)

Career highlights and awards
- 4× World Series champion (2010, 2012, 2014, 2023); NL Manager of the Year (1996)

Bruce Douglas Bochy (/ˈboʊtʃiː/ BOH-chee; born April 16, 1955) is an American baseball manager and former player. Bochy played as a catcher for the Houston Astros, New York Mets, and San Diego Padres. After retiring as a player, Bochy became first a minor league coach and later major league manager. He managed the Padres for 12 seasons (1995–2006), the San Francisco Giants for 13 seasons (2007–2019), and the Texas Rangers for 3 seasons (2023–2025). As manager, Bochy led the Padres to one World Series appearance (1998), the Giants to three World Series championships (2010, 2012, 2014), and the Rangers to the franchise's first World Series championship in his first season with the club (2023). He is one of three managers to win a World Series championship in both leagues. Bochy has the sixth most wins as a manager in MLB History and was the 11th manager to achieve 2,000 wins.

Bochy is the first former Padres player to serve as the team's manager on a non-interim basis. He participated in the first five postseason appearances in Padres history, as a backup catcher in 1984 and as their manager in 1996, 1998, 2005, and 2006. In 1998, he led the Padres to their first National League (NL) pennant in 14 years; however, they lost the 1998 World Series to the New York Yankees.

Bochy reached the World Series for a second time as the manager of the 2010 Giants, this time in a winning effort over the Texas Rangers, and brought the first ever World Series Championship home to the city of San Francisco; it was the first for the Giants franchise since 1954. Two years later, in the 2012 World Series, by sweeping the Detroit Tigers, Bochy managed the Giants to their second World Series Championship win in three years. He reached the World Series for a fourth time, in 2014, and managed his third World Championship in five years, this time leading the Giants over the Kansas City Royals in seven games. In 2023, he came out of retirement to lead his third different franchise to the World Series as the manager of the American League Champion Texas Rangers, joining Bill McKechnie and Dick Williams with that distinction. He is the first manager to do so by way of winning the League Championship Series (the LCS did not exist prior to 1969), and is one of just seven managers in baseball history to win four or more World Series.

Born in France to American parents, Bochy was both the first foreign-born manager to reach the World Series (1998) and the first European-born manager to win the World Series (2010). On July 23, 2013, he became the 21st manager with 1500 wins. On April 10, 2017, Bochy surpassed Dusty Baker for the most wins in the West Coast portion of Giants history. He is the only manager in MLB history to win at least 900 games with two different teams.

== Early life ==
Bruce Douglas Bochy was born on April 16, 1955, in Bussac-Forêt, Charente-Maritime, France), where his father, Sergeant Major (E-9) Gus Bochy, was stationed as a non-commissioned officer in the U.S. Army at the time. Growing up, Bochy moved with his family to the Panama Canal Zone, South Carolina, and Virginia, before settling in Melbourne, Florida.

Bochy graduated from Melbourne High School, where he was a baseball teammate of Darrell Hammond of Saturday Night Live fame.

== College career ==
Bochy attended Brevard Community College (later known as Eastern Florida State College) for two years on a partial scholarship, winning a state championship in 1975, before committing to play baseball for Eddie Stanky at South Alabama. Bochy played for Stroube's Mobil, Washington D.C.'s franchise in the All American Amateur Baseball Association (AABA). He was the RBI leader with 11 in six games during the 1974 National AABA tournament. Stroube's Mobil finished 3rd in the tournament with a record of 4–2 after losing in the consolation round 5–4 in 14 innings to eventual runner-up New Orleans.

== Professional career ==
=== Drafts and minor leagues ===
On January 9, 1975, Bochy was drafted by the Chicago White Sox in the eighth round of the 1975 MLB draft, but did not sign. On June 3, 1975, he was drafted in the first round (24th overall) by the Houston Astros in the 1975 Supplemental Draft and decided to turn professional.

=== Houston Astros (1978–1980) ===
On July 19, 1978 at Shea Stadium, Bochy made his Major League playing debut against the New York Mets. With the Astros, Bochy primarily backed up Alan Ashby at catcher. He was behind the plate in Game 4 of the 1980 NLCS against the Philadelphia Phillies, when Pete Rose ran him over to score the go-ahead run in the top of the tenth inning.

=== New York Mets (1981–1982) ===
On February 11, 1981, Bochy was traded to the Mets for minor leaguers Stan Hough and Randy Rogers. As the third catcher, behind John Stearns and Ron Hodges, he appeared in only 17 games, but was highly productive in his limited opportunities, slashing .306/.358/.510/.869. His stay in Queens lasted only one year, however. On January 21, 1983, he was released by the Mets.

=== San Diego Padres (1983–1987) ===
On February 23, 1983, Bochy signed as a free agent with the San Diego Padres. With the Padres, he was the backup to Terry Kennedy from 1983 to 1986 and rookie catcher Benito Santiago in 1987.

Bochy was the backup to Terry Kennedy when the Padres won their first NL pennant in 1984, and he played in one game in the 1984 World Series, which the Padres lost in five games to the Detroit Tigers.

On July 1, 1985, at Jack Murphy Stadium, in a 6–5 win over the Houston Astros, Bochy hit a tenth inning walk-off home run off of starting pitcher Nolan Ryan, the only walk-off home run allowed in Ryan's Major League record 27-year playing career. On September 11, 1985, at Riverfront Stadium, Bochy was behind the plate when Cincinnati Reds first baseman Pete Rose collected his record-breaking 4,192nd Major League hit, a single, off of Padres starting pitcher Eric Show, surpassing Ty Cobb for the most of all-time.

On November 9, 1987, Bochy was granted free agency.

In 1988, Bochy spent his final season playing in Triple-A Las Vegas where he served as a player-coach, batting .231 in 53 games.

In 802 career at-bats, he hit .239 with 26 home runs.

== Coaching / Executive career ==
=== San Diego Padres (1993–1994) ===
After four years of managing for their minor league affiliates, the San Diego Padres picked Bochy to be the team's third-base coach under new manager Jim Riggleman in 1993.

=== San Francisco Giants (2026–present) ===
On November 10, 2025, the San Francisco Giants hired Bochy to serve as a special assistant to their baseball operations department.

== Managerial career ==
=== Minor leagues ===
After retiring as a player, Bochy was hired by Padres general manager Jack McKeon to manage in their minor league system. He started the 1989 season assisting the Single-A Riverside Red Wave before leaving to manage the Low-A Spokane Indians, leading them to their third consecutive championship. In 1990, Bochy took over as manager of the Red Wave, finishing with a 64–78 record. In 1991, Bochy followed the team to Adelanto, California, where they became the High Desert Mavericks, and led them to a 73–63 record and California League title. In 1992, Bochy was promoted to manager of the Double-A Wichita Wranglers, leading them to the Texas League title that year.

=== San Diego Padres (1995–2006) ===
Following the departure of Riggleman after the 1994 season, the Padres named Bochy as their new manager for the 1995 season. At age 39, Bochy became the youngest manager in the National League.

==== 1995 ====
On April 26, 1995 (the start of the season delayed by a work stoppage), at Jack Murphy Stadium, Bochy made his Major League managerial debut against the team with whom he had started his Major League playing career, the Houston Astros. The following day the Padres defeated the Houston Astros 13-1, earning Bochy his first career managerial win in the Major Leagues. On May 4 at Jack Murphy Stadium, Bochy managed his first career Major League game against his future ballclub, the San Francisco Giants. On July 2 at Candlestick Park, in a 15–3 win (his 31st MLB managerial win), after starting his managerial career 0–6 against the San Francisco Giants, Bochy won his first career game over them. In his 12-year run as Padres manager, Bochy would post a win-loss record of 85–102 against the Giants. The Padres' record improved from 47–70 in the strike-shortened 1994 season to 70–74 in Bochy's rookie year.

==== 1996 ====
In 1996, his second season, Bochy led the Padres to a 91–71 record and their second National League West division title in franchise history, earning Bochy National League Manager of the Year and Sporting News National League Manager of the Year honors.

==== 1998 ====
In 1998, Bochy led the Padres to a franchise-best 98–64 record and the second National League pennant in Padres history, earning Sporting News Manager of the Year honors for the second time. The Padres were swept in four games in the 1998 World Series by the New York Yankees.

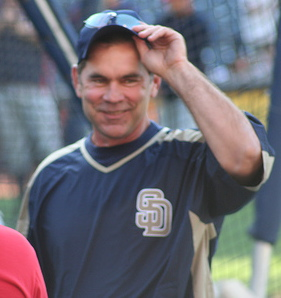
Bochy with the Padres in 2006

After the World Series, the Padres dramatically cut payroll and suffered five straight losing seasons.

==== 2005–2006 ====
In 2005 and 2006, Bochy led the Padres to consecutive NL West titles for the first time in franchise history, but they lost to the St. Louis Cardinals in the Division Series each year. Closing pitcher Trevor Hoffman saved 457 games managed by Bochy, the most saves by one pitcher under one manager in MLB history, according to NBC Sports Bay Area.

After the 2006 season, new Padres CEO Sandy Alderson preferred to have a younger manager, so he allowed Giants General Manager Brian Sabean to interview Bochy for his job opening. Bochy left the Padres for the Giants after the 2006 season.

Bochy finished his Padres managerial career with a regular season record of 951–975 and a post–season record of 8–16. Bochy has the most games managed in Padres history and with that, the most wins and losses. In twelve seasons under Bochy, the Padres had five winning seasons, winning four NL West division titles, one NL pennant, and a World Series appearance. Bochy had not been elected to the San Diego Padres Hall of Fame or had his number 15 retired, which remains in circulation. While with the Padres, Bochy also managed the 2004 and 2006 MLB All-Stars in the Major League Baseball Japan All-Star Series.

=== San Francisco Giants (2007–2019) ===
On October 27, 2006 at AT&T Park, in a press conference beside general manager Brian Sabean, Bochy agreed to a three-year contract to replace Felipe Alou and become the Giants' new manager, their 38th in franchise history. "I wasn't really ready to make a change, but (general manager) Brian Sabean made a strong case that he's as hungry as I am to reach the goal we all want to reach, and that's to win a World Series," Bochy said. "The more I talk to Brian, the more excited I get about what I could do here. It's no news to anybody here that this ballclub has gotten off track the last couple years, but this is a storied franchise with a great history, and I am looking forward to this opportunity to bring winning baseball back to San Francisco."

==== 2007 ====
Bochy managed veteran left fielder Barry Bonds in what would be Bonds' last season. On August 4 at Petco Park, Bonds hit his 755th career Major League home run against former Giants draftee, San Diego Padres starting pitcher, and future 2012 World Series champion Giant Clay Hensley, tying Hank Aaron's all-time record. Before the game, Bochy threw live batting practice to Bonds for 30 minutes. On August 7 at AT&T Park, Bonds hit his 756th career Major League home run off of Washington Nationals starting pitcher Mike Bacsik, breaking the all-time record, formerly held by Aaron. "This is the greatest record in all of sports," Bochy said. "We are all fortunate to witness it. It's awesome. This road to history has been a lot of fun." The next day and game, on August 8 at AT&T Park, in a 5–0 win over the Washington Nationals, Bochy won his 1,000th game as manager in his 2,038th game managed. 64 managers in Major League history have won 1,000 career games and half of them are enshrined in the National Baseball Hall of Fame & Museum.

==== 2008–2009 ====
After two seasons of 90+ losses in 2007 and 2008, the Giants rebounded to finish 88–74 in 2009, and remained in the playoff race into September behind a pitching staff with the second-lowest ERA in the Majors. After the season, Bochy received a new two-year contract with an option for 2012.

==== 2010 ====
In 2010, the Giants finished 92–70 and clinched their first NL West title since 2003 on the final day of the regular season against his former team, the San Diego Padres. Bochy's Giants defeated the Atlanta Braves in the 2010 NLDS and the reigning two-time defending National League champion (who had won a World Series during that stretch) Philadelphia Phillies in the NLCS. Giants management was presented with the Warren C. Giles Trophy in the visiting locker room while the team was celebrating. Interviewed by sportscaster Chris Rose during the trophy presentation ceremony, Bochy said “Not bad for a bunch of castoffs and misfits." The Giants defeated the Texas Rangers in five games in the 2010 World Series, bringing the first World Series championship to San Francisco and the Giants' first title since 1954 when the team was based in New York City. Following the season, the Giants exercised Bochy's 2012 contract option. Bochy had managed in 2,574 games before earning his first World Series title, which established a record for most games managed to win a World Series that stood for 12 years, when former Giants manager Dusty Baker won the World Series with the Houston Astros.

==== 2011 ====
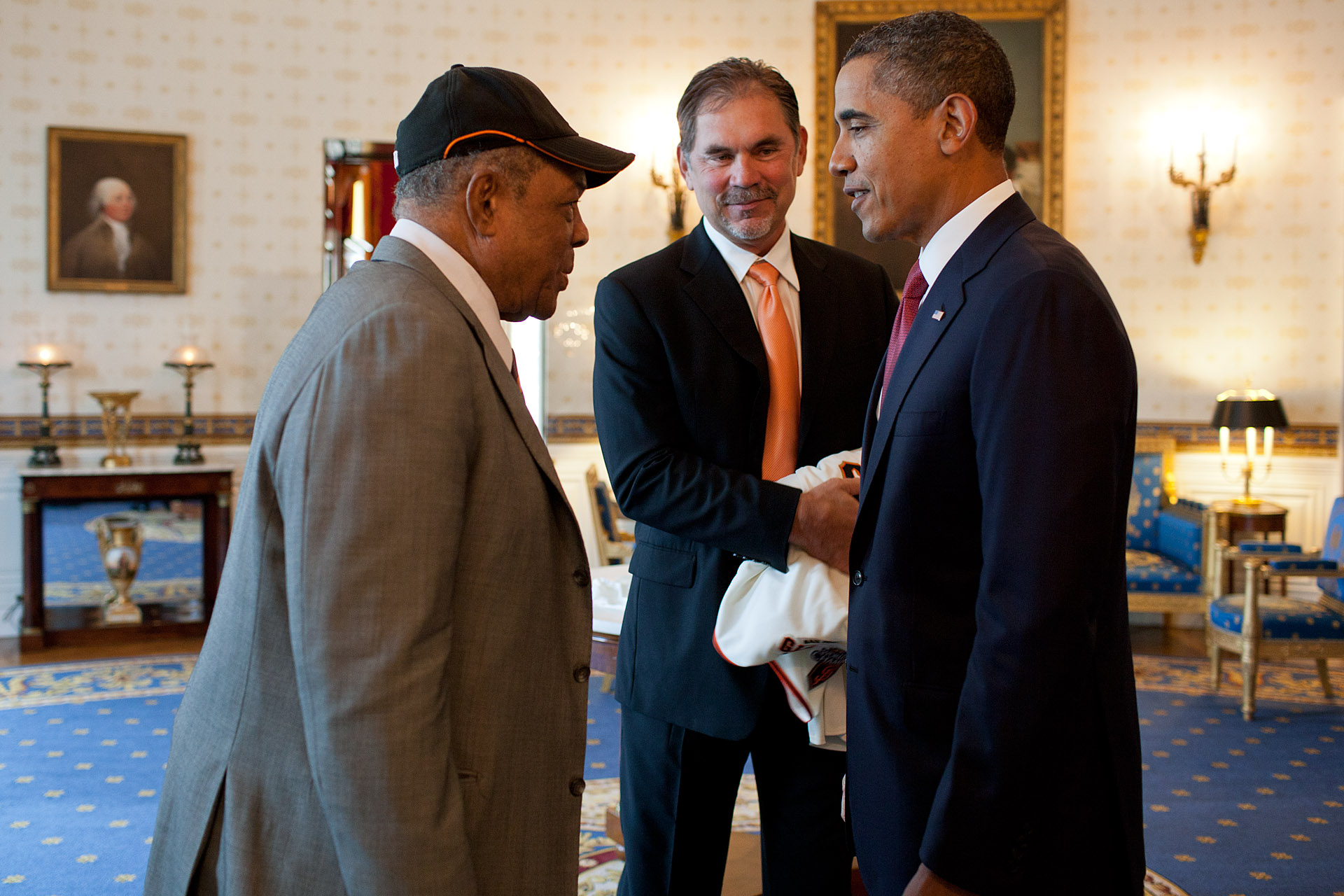
Bochy talks with Willie Mays and President Barack Obama in the Blue Room of the White House before an event honoring the 2010 World Series championship team in 2011.

On June 26, 2011 at AT&T Park, in a 3-1 win over the Cleveland Indians, Bochy won his 367th game as manager of the San Francisco Giants, surpassing Alvin Dark for 10th place in franchise history. In 2011, the Giants finished 86–76 and missed the playoffs. After the season, the Giants extended Bochy's contract through 2013, with an option for 2014.

==== 2012 ====
In 2012, the Giants clinched the NL West for the second time in three years against the Padres, finishing with a 94–68 record. In the postseason, the Giants fell behind the Cincinnati Reds 0–2 in the 2012 NLDS before winning three straight games to stave off elimination. In the NLCS, the Giants fell behind the St. Louis Cardinals three games to one, but again won three straight elimination games to clinch their second National League pennant in three seasons. When Fox Sports sportscaster Erin Andrews asked Giants general manager Brian Sabean about Bochy during the live NLCS trophy presentation, he said "...he's a Hall of Fame manager in my mind." The Giants swept the 2012 World Series against the Detroit Tigers in four games. He became the first National League manager to win two World Series' in a three-year span since the Cincinnati Reds' Sparky Anderson won back-to-back in 1975 and 1976. "In 2010, I think we characterized that club as 'a bunch of misfits' that got together and got it done. Well if I had to put a tagline and hang it on this club, it would be 'never say die,'" said Bochy after the season. "We got down two–oh to the Reds, 'never say die.' We got down down in St. Louis, three–one, 'never say die.' And that last game, against Detroit, it was the first time we got behind and they 'never say die.'"

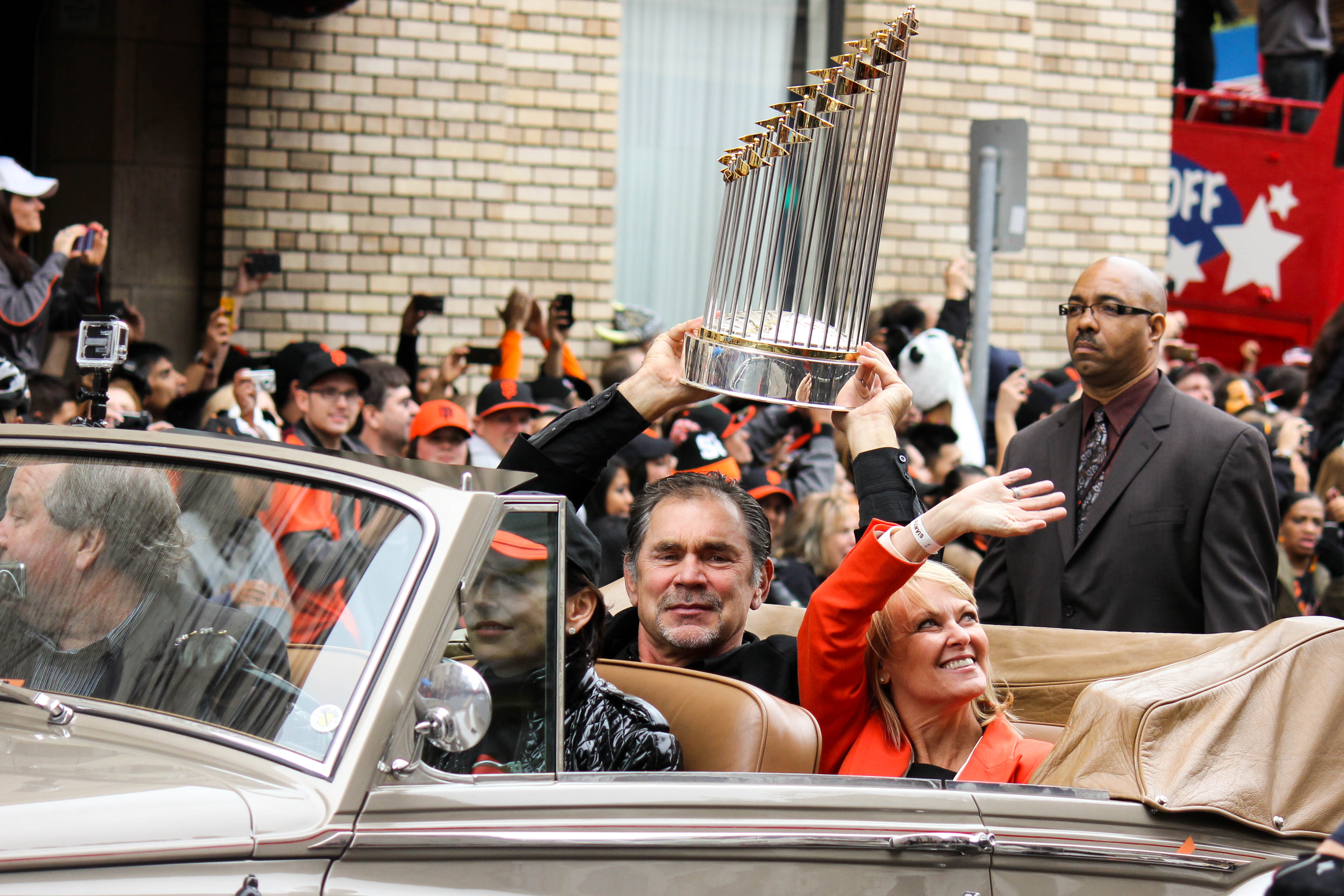
Bochy holding the Commissioner's Trophy with his wife Kim in the 2012 World Series parade

==== 2013 ====
Before the 2013 season, the Giants extended Bochy's contract through 2016. On July 23, 2013 at AT&T Park, in the second game of a doubleheader, a 5–3 win over the Cincinnati Reds, Bochy became the 21st manager in Major League history to win 1,500 career games. The Giants finished the season 76–86 and missed the playoffs in 2013. When Jim Leyland retired after the 2013 season, Bochy became MLB's active leader in wins with 1,530.

==== 2014 ====
On August 27, 2014 at AT&T Park, in a 4–2 walk-off win over the Colorado Rockies, Bochy became the 19th manager in Major League history to reach 1,600 career wins, and also became the all-time NL Western Division leader in managerial wins, passing Los Angeles Dodgers manager Tommy Lasorda for that distinction, since the installment of division play in 1969. With an 88–74 record, the Giants made the 2014 postseason as the second wild-card team. During a low point of the regular season, Bochy told his players they had "champion blood", referring to the Giants' 2010 and 2012 championships. After defeating the Pittsburgh Pirates in the NL Wild Card Game, the Giants beat the heavily favored Washington Nationals three games to one in the NLDS and the St. Louis Cardinals four games to one in the NLCS for their third NL pennant in five years. Bochy's "group of warriors" went on to defeat the Kansas City Royals to win the 2014 World Series, a series that went the full seven games. Bochy became the first NL manager to win three World Series championships in a five-year span and the tenth manager in MLB history to win three championships, with the previous nine all inducted into the National Baseball Hall of Fame and Museum. When Fox Sports sportscaster Erin Andrews interviewed Bochy alongside Giants management somewhere in the visiting locker room for the trophy presentation, he said "I'm just honored to manage this 'group of warriors.' They were relentless the whole time and really just kept amazing me throughout the playoffs." (Note: The previous nine are Joe McCarthy (7), Casey Stengel (7), Connie Mack (5), Walter Alston (4), Joe Torre (4), Sparky Anderson (3), Miller Huggins (3), Tony La Russa (3), and John McGraw (3).)

==== 2015 ====
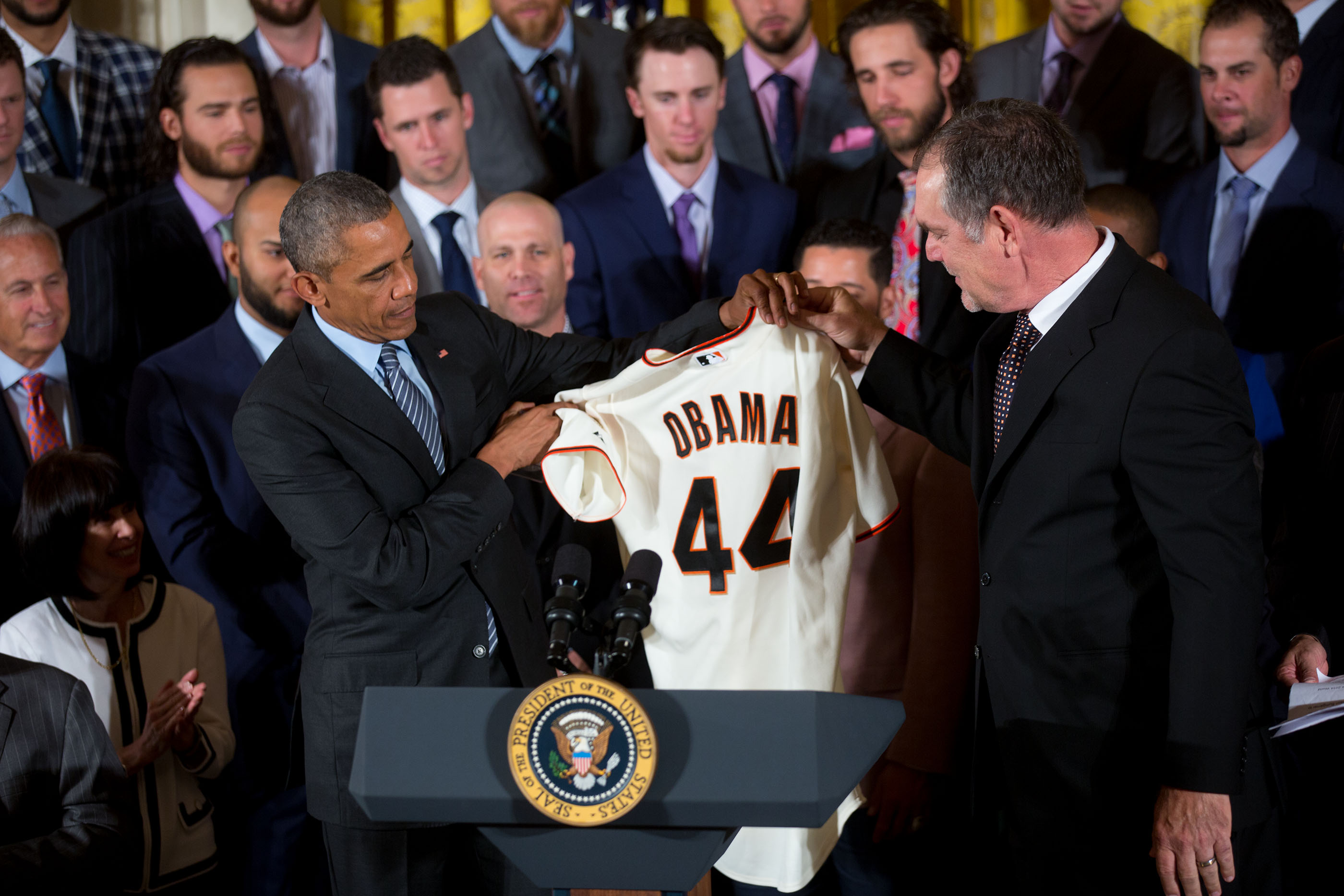
Bochy presenting President Barack Obama with a baseball jersey during an event welcoming the Giants to the White House, honoring the team and their 2014 World Series victory in the East Room in 2015

On April 3, 2015, the Giants announced Bochy had signed a contract extension through the 2019 season. On June 10, 2015, Bochy recorded his 700th win as Giants manager, making him the fourth in history to win at least 700 games for two different teams, joining Sparky Anderson, Tony La Russa, and Jim Leyland. The milestone came on the same night that Chris Heston threw a no-hitter for the Giants, the fifth no-hitter by the Giants under Bochy (Jonathan Sánchez in 2009; Matt Cain's perfect game in 2012; and Tim Lincecum in 2013 and 2014). On September 27, 2015 at O.co Coliseum, in a 5–4 win over the Oakland Athletics, Bochy became the 16th manager in Major League history to record 1,700 career wins. The Giants finished with an 84–78 record and missed the playoffs in 2015.

==== 2016 ====
On June 26, 2016, Bochy recorded his 800th win as Giants manager. On June 30, Bochy became the first manager since 1976 to intentionally forfeit the designated hitter, allowing Madison Bumgarner to bat for himself against the Oakland Athletics. With an 87–75 record, the Giants made the 2016 postseason as the second wild-card team, clinching on the final day of the regular season. The Giants defeated the New York Mets 3–0 in the NL Wild Card Game, their 11th straight postseason series win, dating back to 2010. The Giants lost the 2016 NLDS in four games to the Chicago Cubs, their first postseason series loss under Bochy.

==== 2017 ====
On April 9, 2017, at Petco Park, in a 5–3 win over the San Diego Padres, Bochy won his 840th game as Giants manager, tying Dusty Baker for the most wins in the West Coast portion of Giants history. The next day, in the Giants' home opener at AT&T Park and a 4–1 win over the Arizona Diamondbacks, Bochy surpassed Baker to become the all-time San Francisco Giants managerial wins leader. On May 3, 2017 at Dodger Stadium, in a 4–1 win over the Los Angeles Dodgers, Bochy became the 15th manager in Major League history to reach 1,800 career wins. On September 25 at Chase Field, in a 9–2 win over the Arizona Diamondbacks, Bochy won his 900th career game as manager of the San Francisco Giants, making him the first manager in Major League history to win 900 games with two different teams. Expected to be postseason contenders in 2017, the Giants instead fell to 64–98, matching Bochy's worst record as a manager, (Note: The 2003 San Diego Padres also finished 64–98.) and the Giants' worst since 1985.

==== 2018 ====
"If you're not prepared, it's not pressure you feel, it’s fear."

— Bruce Bochy

On July 29, 2018, Bochy recorded his 1,906th career victory as manager, surpassing Casey Stengel into 11th place on MLB's career wins list. Numerous injuries and an underperforming offense resulted in the Giants finishing 73–89 in 2018. With Mike Scioscia stepping down as the Los Angeles Angels manager on the last day of the 2018 MLB season, Bochy entered the 2019 season as the longest-tenured manager in Major League Baseball.

==== 2019 ====
During the offseason, Farhan Zaidi was named president of baseball operations of the Giants. There was speculation and many questions about Bochy's future with the club, as his contract was set to expire at the end of the 2019 season. On February 18, 2019 at Scottsdale Stadium, Bochy announced that he would be retiring following the conclusion of the 2019 season. During his final season as Giants manager, some opposing teams honored Bochy with gifts during his final visit to their city. On June 4 at Citi Field, in a 9–3 win over the New York Mets, Bochy won his 1,000th game as manager of the Giants. Bochy became the 25th manager to win 1,000 games with one team. He also joined John McGraw as the only two managers in Giants' franchise history to reach the milestone, and the first in San Francisco. On August 25, 2019 at Oakland-Alameda County Coliseum, in a 5–4 win over the Oakland Athletics, Bochy managed his 4,000th career game. He became only the eighth manager to manage 4,000 games. On September 18, 2019 at Fenway Park, in an 11–3 win over the Boston Red Sox, Bochy achieved his 2,000th career win as a Major League manager, becoming the eleventh manager to reach that milestone. The other ten managers are all in the National Baseball Hall of Fame and Museum.

On September 29 at Oracle Park, at the conclusion of Fan Appreciation Day and Weekend against the Los Angeles Dodgers, Bochy managed his final career game as Giants' manager in San Francisco. The Giants organization, which ranged from alumni, coaches, executives, former players from the 2007 to 2009 Giants, 2010, 2012, and 2014 World Series championship teams, honored Bochy in a postgame ceremony bidding farewell to him. Bochy was also surrounded by his family. The event was broadcast live on local television on NBC Sports Bay Area, and included speeches from president and chief executive officer Larry Baer, former players Jake Peavy, Gregor Blanco, and Ryan Vogelsong, and current players Buster Posey and Pablo Sandoval, before Bochy emotionally addressed the crowd. "...to manage here with these players, in this city, with you fans, has been one of the greatest blessings in my life," Bochy said towards the end of his farewell speech. Bochy ended it by echoing the words of The Great Lou Gehrig. "I consider myself the luckiest man on the face of this Earth." When the President of the United States leaves office, traditionally he leaves a written note in the Oval Office desk for his successor. When asked in his final Giants question postgame at the podium what he would write, Bochy said "Yeah. You know, I'd probably leave a note telling him he get the best job in baseball."

Bochy finished his Giants managerial career with a regular season record of 1,052–1,054 and a post–season record of 36–17. In 13 seasons under Bochy, the Giants had seven winning seasons, resulting in two National League West Division titles and two Wild Card Game berths in four playoff appearances, as well as three NL pennants and World Series championships. After retiring as field manager, Bochy served in a front office role with the Giants. The Giants have not reissued Bochy's number 15.

On October 24, Bochy hinted at managing professionally again during an interview with Chris "Mad Dog" Russo on SiriusXM. “I’m just hitting the pause button. That’s all, you know, and taking a sabbatical here for a year and then, you know, I’ll see where I’m at,” Bochy said. “I don’t know how I’m gonna feel but I’d love to have one more shot.” On December 9, Bochy was named Manager of the France national baseball team.

=== Texas Rangers (2023–2025) ===
On October 21, 2022, the Texas Rangers hired Bochy, coming out of retirement, as their new manager and 29th in franchise history.

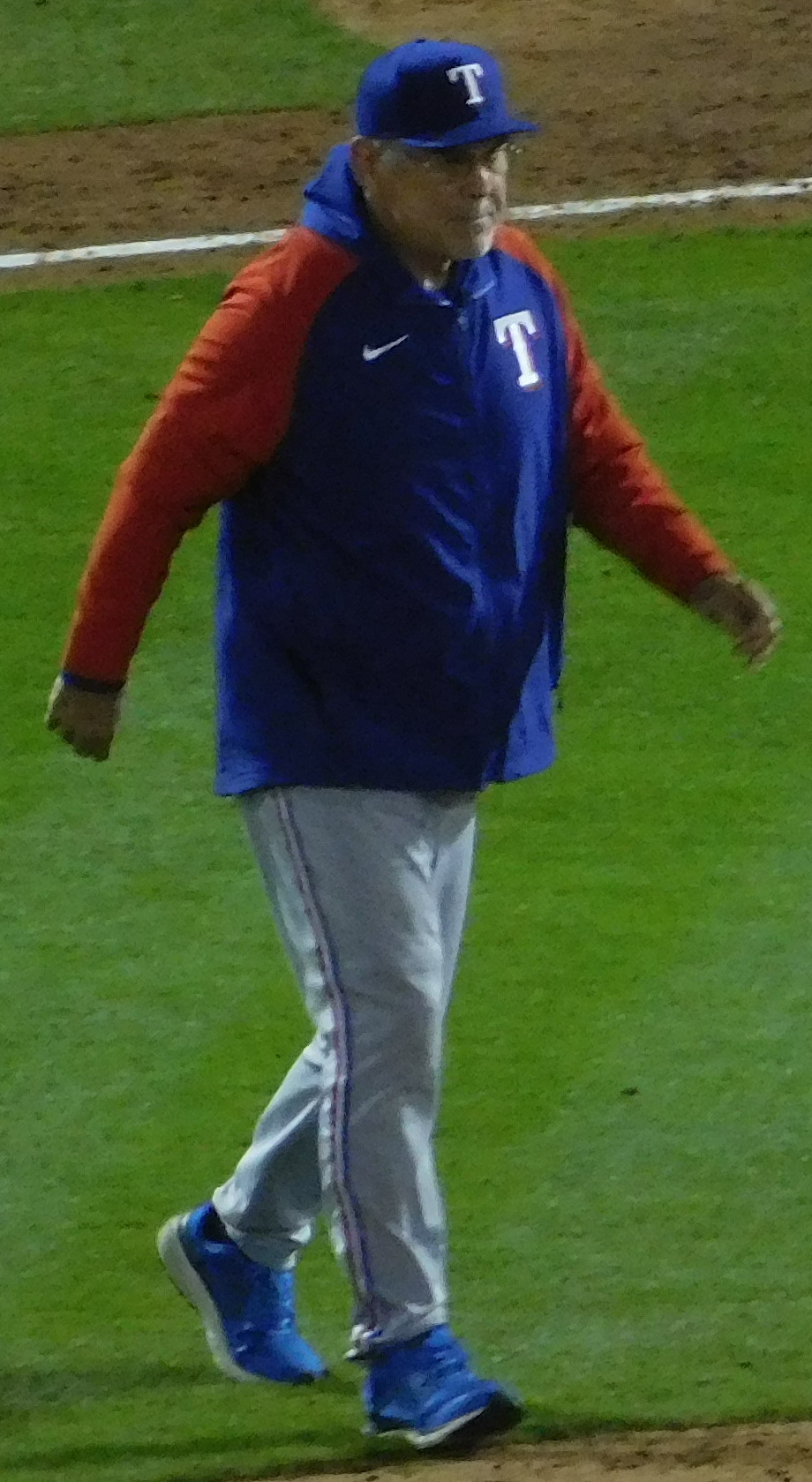
Bochy managing in 2023

On June 4, 2023, Bochy won his 2,041st career game, surpassing Walter Alston for 10th place on the all-time managerial wins list.

On October 16, 2023, New York Yankees' Executive, former Giants' Senior Vice President of Baseball Operations, General Manager, and friend Brian Sabean appeared as a guest on The Krueg Show, and revealed why he and Bochy really left the Giants organization. “He didn’t go out on his own terms. The whole world knows that,” Sabean said speaking on behalf of Bochy. On October 23, 2023, Bochy led the Texas Rangers past the Houston Astros to win Game 7 of the American League Championship series, thus clinching the franchise's third trip to the World Series. This became the third different MLB franchise Bochy had led to the World Series. The Rangers defeated the Arizona Diamondbacks in five games, making Bochy the fifth manager to have won a World Series with multiple teams, and the first manager to have defeated a team in the World Series and later manage that team to a title. He became the sixth manager in MLB history to win four championships, with the previous five all inducted into the National Baseball Hall of Fame and Museum.

On May 15, 2025, Bochy won his 2,195th game as a manager, ranking sixth and passing Sparky Anderson on the all-time MLB managerial wins list. On June 12, 2025, after starting the season with a win–loss record of 33–36, there was buzz in the industry that Bochy could retire after the season, according to Jim Bowden of The Athletic. After an 81–81 season in 2025, the Rangers announced that Bochy would not return as manager in 2026.

=== Managerial record ===
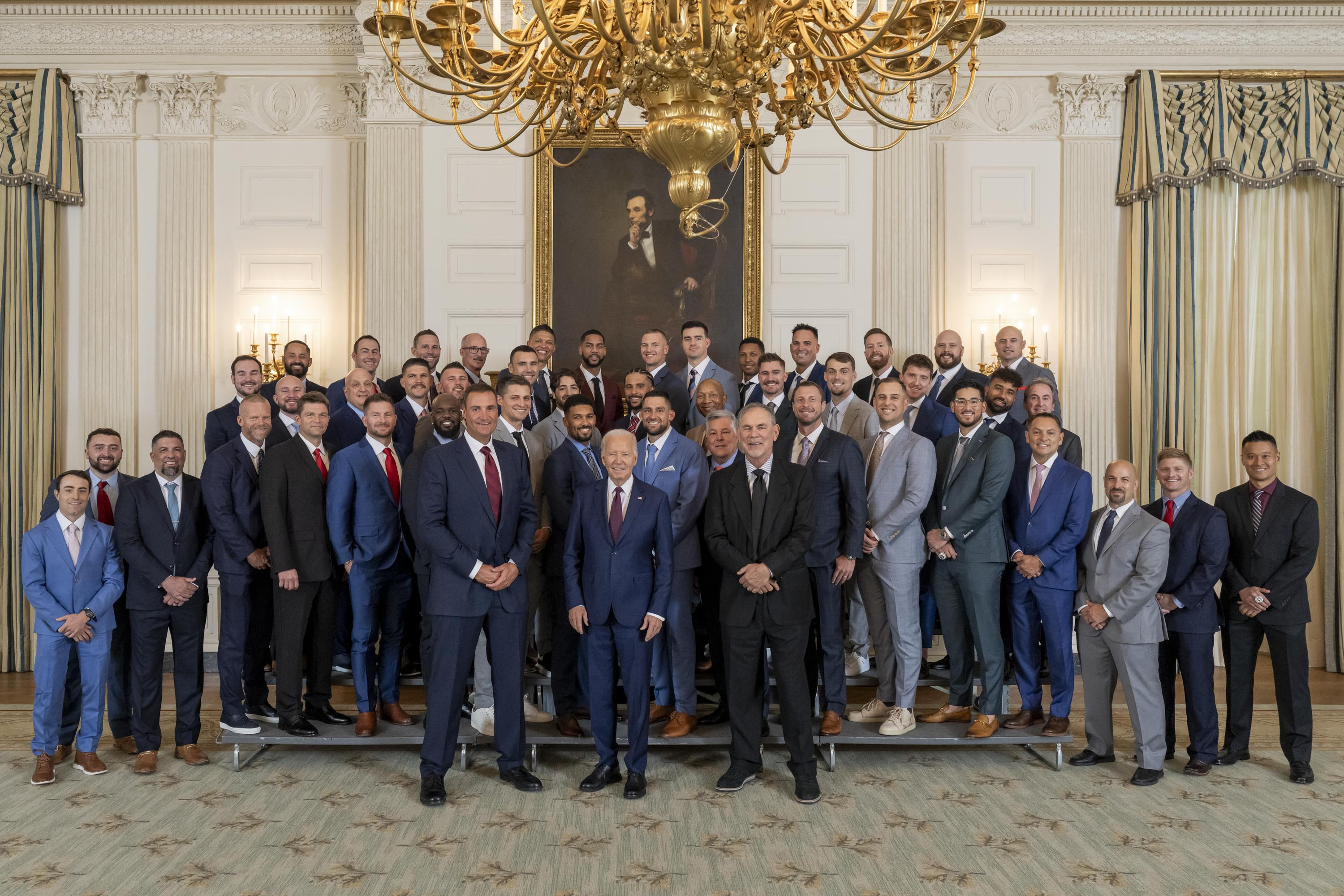
President Joe Biden posing for a photo with Bochy and members of the Texas Rangers 2023 World Series championship team in the State Dining Room of the White House in 2024

Team	Year	Regular season					Postseason			
Team	Year	Games	Won	Lost	Win %	Finish	Won	Lost	Win %	Result
SD	1995	144	70	74	.486	3rd in NL West	–	–	–	
SD	1996	162	91	71	.562	1st in NL West	0	3	.000	Lost NLDS (STL)
SD	1997	162	76	86	.469	4th in NL West	–	–	–	
SD	1998	162	98	64	.605	1st in NL West	7	7	.500	Lost World Series (NYY)
SD	1999	162	74	88	.457	4th in NL West	–	–	–	
SD	2000	162	76	86	.469	5th in NL West	–	–	–	
SD	2001	162	79	83	.488	4th in NL West	–	–	–	
SD	2002	162	66	96	.407	5th in NL West	–	–	–	
SD	2003	162	64	98	.395	5th in NL West	–	–	–	
SD	2004	162	87	75	.537	3rd in NL West	–	–	–	
SD	2005	162	82	80	.506	1st in NL West	0	3	.000	Lost NLDS (STL)
SD	2006	162	88	74	.543	1st in NL West	1	3	.250	Lost NLDS (STL)
SD total		1,926	951	975	.494		8	16	.333	
SF	2007	162	71	91	.438	5th in NL West	–	–	–	
SF	2008	162	72	90	.444	4th in NL West	–	–	–	
SF	2009	162	88	74	.543	3rd in NL West	–	–	–	
SF	2010	162	92	70	.568	1st in NL West	11	4	.733	Won World Series (TEX)
SF	2011	162	86	76	.531	2nd in NL West	–	–	–	
SF	2012	162	94	68	.580	1st in NL West	11	5	.688	Won World Series (DET)
SF	2013	162	76	86	.469	3rd in NL West	–	–	–	
SF	2014	162	88	74	.543	2nd in NL West	12	5	.706	Won World Series (KC)
SF	2015	162	84	78	.519	2nd in NL West	–	–	–	
SF	2016	162	87	75	.537	2nd in NL West	2	3	.400	Lost NLDS (CHC)
SF	2017	162	64	98	.395	5th in NL West	–	–	–	
SF	2018	162	73	89	.451	4th in NL West	–	–	–	
SF	2019	162	77	85	.475	3rd in NL West	–	–	–	
SF total		2,106	1,052	1,054	.499		36	17	.679	
TEX	2023	162	90	72	.556	2nd in AL West	13	4	.765	Won World Series (ARI)
TEX	2024	162	78	84	.481	3rd in AL West	–	–	–	
TEX	2025	162	81	81	.500	3rd in AL West	–	–	–	
TEX total		486	249	237	.512		13	4	.765	
Total		4,518	2,252	2,266	.498		57	37	.606	

== Personal life ==
Bochy is the third of four children. His older brother Joe was a one-time catcher in the Minnesota Twins system, and later worked as a professional scout for the Padres and Giants.

Bochy met his wife, Kim Seib, while at Brevard Community College in 1975 and they married in 1978. They reside in Poway, California and Nashville, Tennessee, and have two sons: Greg and Brett. Greg Bochy spent several seasons playing minor league baseball in the San Diego Padres system. Bochy's younger son, Brett Bochy, was drafted by the Giants in 2010. Brett was called up to the majors on September 2, 2014, making Bruce the seventh manager in MLB history to manage his own son. On September 13, 2014, Bruce became the first manager to give the ball to his son coming out of the bullpen.

Bochy is known for having one of the largest cap sizes in Major League Baseball. With Houston, his nickname was "Headly," due to his unusually large head, with a hat size measurement of 8 1/8. When he joined the Mets in 1982, they did not have a helmet that would fit him, and they had to send for the ones he was using in the minors.

On February 19, 2015, Bochy underwent angioplasty to have two stents inserted in a blood vessel that was 90 percent blocked. On August 8, 2016, Bochy was hospitalized overnight for an irregular heartbeat and underwent a cardioversion procedure, missing one game. On April 18, 2017, Bochy underwent a minor heart ablation to reduce discomfort, mostly due to an atrial flutter, and missed two games. After the 2017 season, Bochy underwent another ablation procedure to treat an atrial fibrillation.

In May 2011, Bochy won the Ronald L. Jensen Award for Lifetime Achievement, which he accepted at Positive Coaching Alliance's National Youth Sports Awards. In 2011, the baseball field at Brevard Community College was named Bruce Bochy Field in his honor. In 2015, Bochy released A Book of Walks (ISBN 978-0985419035), describing his favorite walks around San Francisco and other major league cities.

Bochy has rated Johnny Bench as the first choice on "His Top Five Catchers, All-Time" list, with the following in descending order: Carlton Fisk, Yogi Berra, Thurman Munson, and Iván Rodríguez.

== See also ==
- List of Major League Baseball managers with most career ejections
- List of Major League Baseball managers with most career wins

Sporting positions
Preceded by Steve Lubratich	Spokane Indians manager 1989	Succeeded by Gene Glynn
Preceded by Steve Lubratich	Riverside Red Wave manager 1990	Succeeded by last manager
Preceded by first manager	High Desert Mavericks manager 1991	Succeeded by Bryan Little
Preceded by Steve Lubratich	Wichita Wranglers manager 1992	Succeeded by Dave Trembley
