= Bussac-Forêt =

- Commune
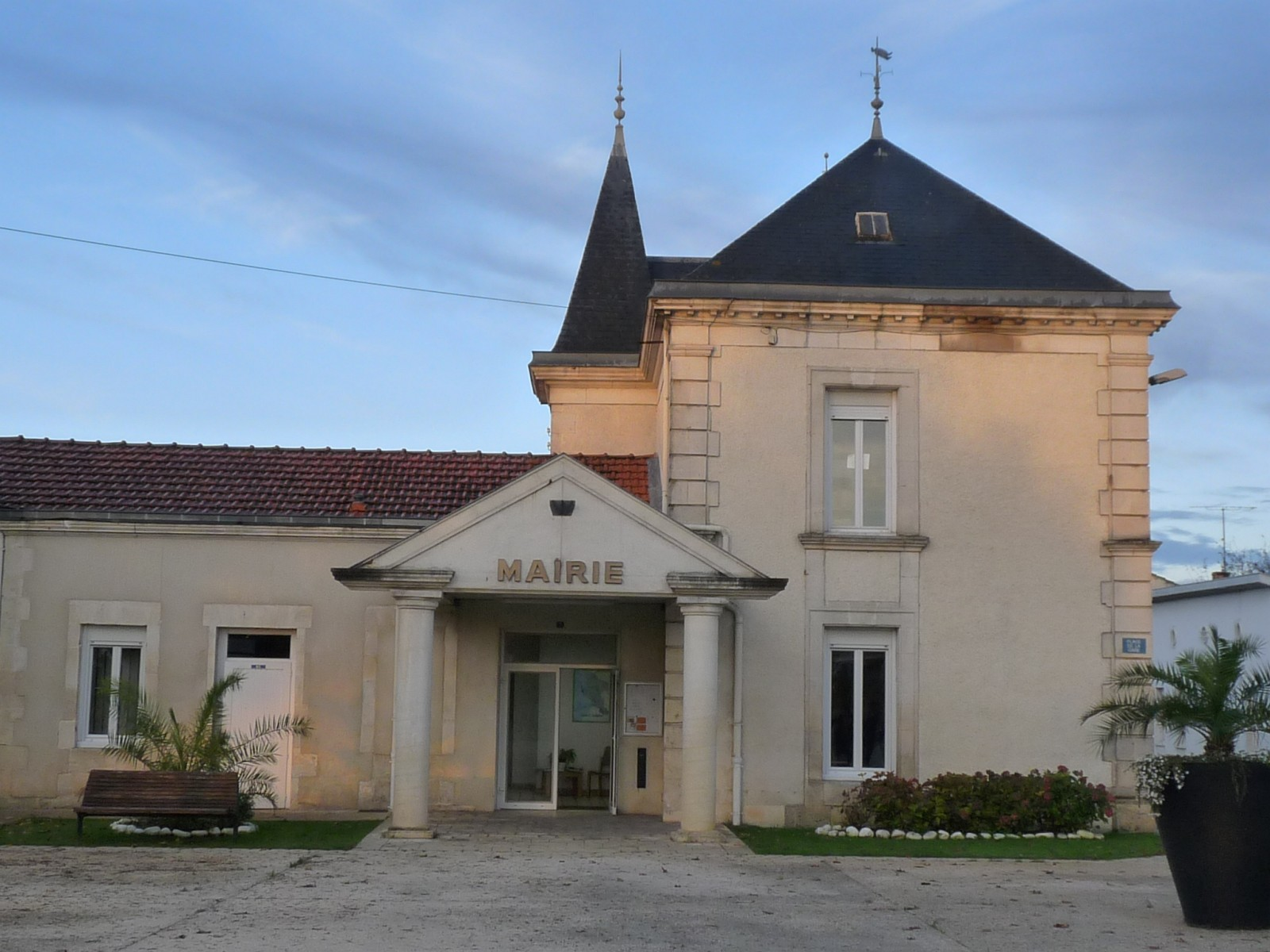
- The town hall in Bussac-Forêt
- Location of Bussac-Forêt
- Location within France Location within Nouvelle-Aquitaine
- Coordinates: 45°12′48″N 0°22′07″W
- Country: France
- Region: Nouvelle-Aquitaine
- Department: Charente-Maritime
- Arrondissement: Jonzac
- Canton: Les Trois Monts
- Intercommunality: Haute-Saintonge

Government
  - Mayor (2020–2026): Lise Mattiazzo
- Area^{1}: 34.78 km^{2} (13.43 sq mi)
- Elevation: 63 m (207 ft)
- Highest elevation: 85 m (279 ft)
- Lowest elevation: 39 m (128 ft)
- Population (2023): 1,074
  - Density: 30.88/km^{2} (79.98/sq mi)
- Time zone: UTC+01:00 (CET)
  - Summer (DST): UTC+02:00 (CEST)
- INSEE/Postal code: 17074 /17220
- ^{1} French Land Register data, which excludes lakes, ponds, glaciers > 1 km^{2} (0.386 sq mi or 247 acres) and river estuaries.

Bussac-Forêt (French pronunciation: [bysak fɔʁɛ]) is a commune in the Charente-Maritime department in the Nouvelle-Aquitaine region in southwestern France.

Located near the town is the former Landes de Bussac Airfield, mainly utilized by the German Luftwaffe during World War II. It was formally closed in 1953 and dismantled by the 1970s, with no trace left as of today .

== Population ==
Historical population
Year	Pop.	±% p.a.
1968	609	—
1975	702	+2.05%
1982	753	+1.01%
1990	860	+1.67%
1999	872	+0.15%
2007	947	+1.04%
2012	997	+1.03%
2017	1,034	+0.73%
2023	1,074	+0.63%
Source: INSEE

== Notable people ==
- Bruce Bochy, MLB baseball manager born in Bussac-Forêt in 1955. Manager of the France national baseball team at the 2023 World Baseball Classic.

== See also ==
- Communes of the Charente-Maritime department
