= Gailes Airfield =

Gailes Airfield
- Wivenhoe Hill, Queensland in Australia
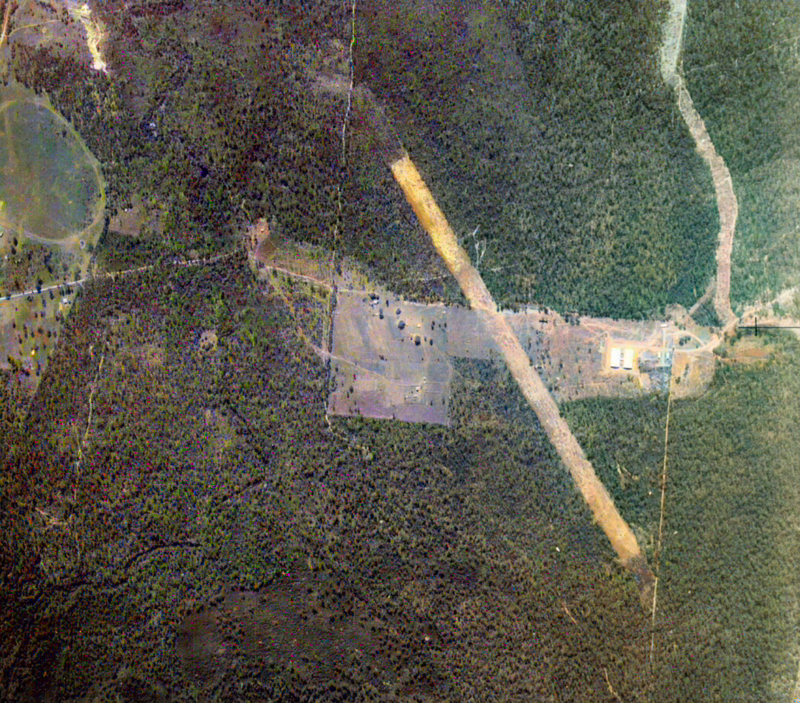
- Colorized aerial photograph of Gailes Airfield, captured on 1 June, 1944.

Site information
- Type: Emergency Landing Ground
- Owner: Australian Defence Force
- Operator: Royal Australian Air Force
- Condition: Demolished

Location
- Shown within Australia
- Coordinates: 27°22′11″S 152°33′35″E

Site history
- Built: May 1942
- Built by: Hornibrook
- In use: 1942 - April 1944
- Fate: Abandoned

Airfield information
- Elevation: 24.4 metres (80 ft) AMSL
- Constructed for the American military, but never reported to be used by the RAAF.

Gailes Airfield (also known as Wacol or A-9) was an Emergency Landing Ground built in 1942, Wivenhoe Hill, Queensland, Australia.

== History ==
In May 1942, Gailes Airfield was constructed by Brisbane based contractor Hornibrook intended for usage by the American military, however control was assumed by the Royal Australian Air Force (RAAF). For the majority of its operations, it operated as a Relief Landing Ground, and the RAAF was never reported to have used it. The airfield was equipped with a wooden hangar and camouflaged hideouts, and was designated as a B-1 type airfield, which meant that it had one runway greater than 800 yards long. In August 1943, a detailed RAAF inspection reported a cleared and graded runway which was unusable due to the growth of plant suckers and log barricades, which was later removed in September 1943. By November 1943, Gailes Airfield was used as a crash strip, and in May 1944, a large 7.6 m wide and 3 m deep hole existed in the centre of the strip.

Adjacent to the airfield was the Darra Ordnance Ammunition Depot, built by the Thiess Brothers in the 1940s.

== Closure ==
According to a U.S. report in April 1944, the project was abandoned after preliminary work, was declared open land, and that nearby facilities had since ceased operations. The suburb of Carole Park was built over the site of the airfield, and no trace remains.
