= No. 102 Squadron RAAF =

Royal Australian Air Force squadron

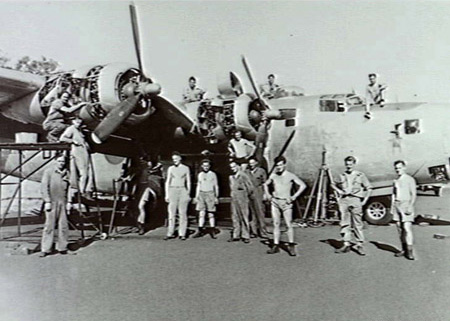
- A No. 102 Squadron B-24 Liberator undergoing a routine inspection in 1945
- Active: 1945–1946
- Country: Australia
- Branch: Royal Australian Air Force
- Role: Heavy bomber
- Base: Cecil Plains
- Engagements: World War II

Insignia
- Squadron code: BV

Aircraft flown
- Bomber: B-24 Liberator
- Trainer: Avro Anson de Havilland Tiger Moth

No. 102 Squadron was a Royal Australian Air Force (RAAF) heavy bomber squadron of World War II. The squadron was only active for less than nine months before being disbanded. No. 102 Squadron was formed at Cecil Plains, Queensland on 31 May 1945. The Squadron's B-24 Liberator bombers arrived in July. While the Squadron began training on these aircraft, the war ended before it reached operational status. Following the end of the war the squadron operated in the transport role until December 1945. No. 102 Squadron was disbanded on 19 March 1946.

== History ==
No. 102 Squadron was formed at Cecil Plains, Queensland, on 30 May 1945 as one of the seven RAAF operational squadrons equipped with B-24 Liberator heavy bombers. The squadron's first commanding officer was Squadron Leader John Dennett. The squadron's first draft of 220 airmen arrived on 22 June, and the unit had a strength of 600 personnel on 1 July. No. 102 Squadron's first B-24s were delivered on 4 July, with further heavy bombers and a single Avro Anson trainer being delivered on the 8th of the month; the Anson was later replaced by a de Havilland Tiger Moth.

Following the delivery of its B-24s, No. 102 Squadron began an intensive training program; however, the war ended before this was completed. The unit began practising formation flying in early August, and on the 16th of the month nine of its B-24s flew in formation over Brisbane to mark Victory in the Pacific Day. From September to the late December 1945, No. 102 Squadron aircraft operated out of RAAF Station Amberley, from where they flew supplies to Australian forces in Morotai, Finschhafen in New Guinea and Bougainville and returned with demobilised personnel. Two officers from the squadron were also assigned to No. 82 Wing's headquarters on Morotai from September to assist with planning air evacuation flights.

No. 102 Squadron's flying program tapered off during December 1945, and ended on the 20th of the month. The squadron began to disband in early January 1946, and it was gradually reduced in size. No. 102 Squadron was disbanded at Cecil Plains on 19 March 1946. The unit did not suffer any flying accidents during its brief existence.

== See also ==
- B-24 Liberators in Australian service
