= Leyburn Airfield =

Leyburn Airfield
- Leyburn, Queensland in Australia
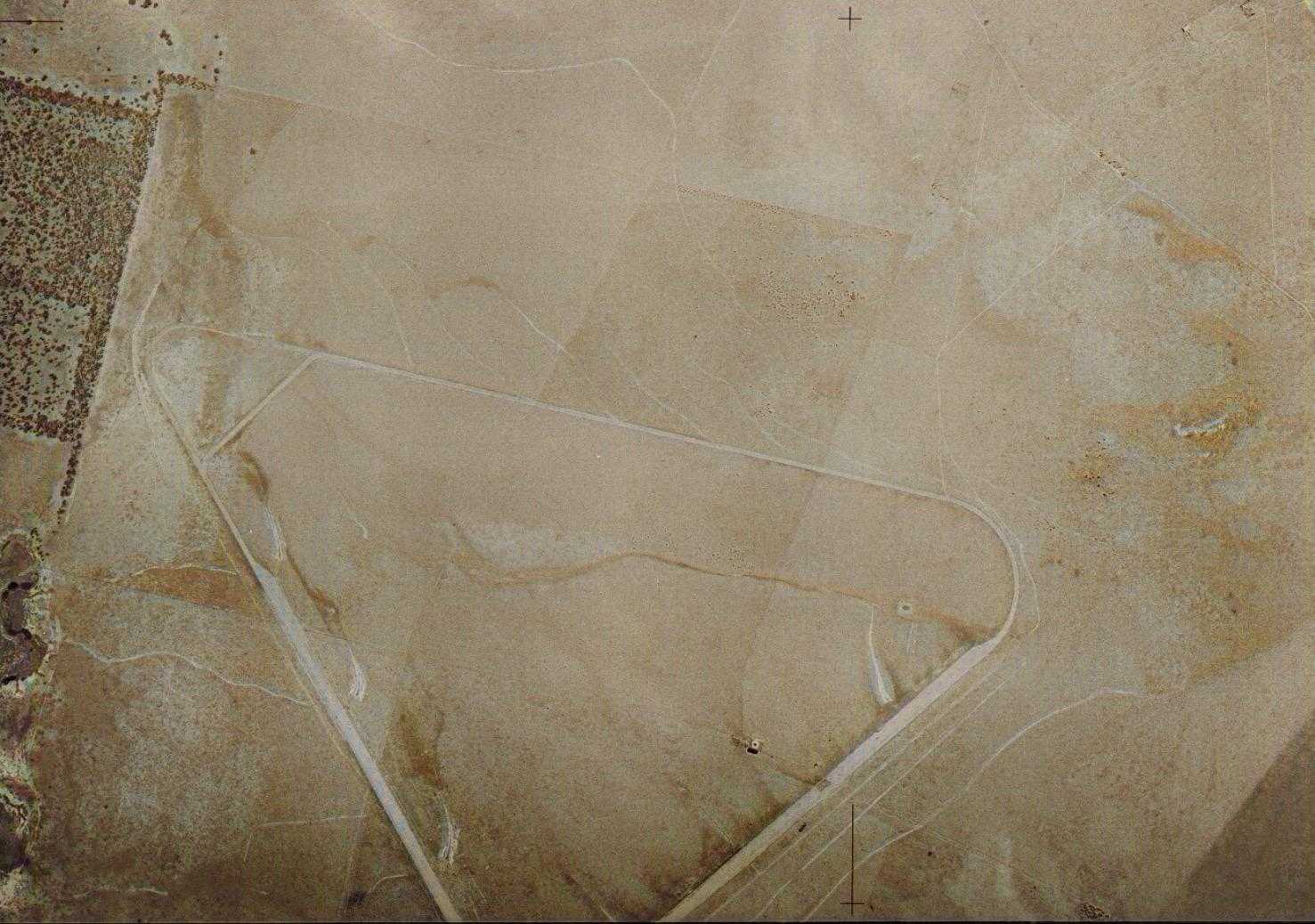
- Leyburn Airfield on 1 October 1954.

Site information
- Type: Defunct
- Owner: Australian Defence Force
- Operator: Royal Australian Air Force

Location
- Shown within Australia
- Coordinates: 27°22′11″S 152°33′35″E

Site history
- Built: 8 May 1942 - April 1943
- In use: April 1944 - 1945
- Fate: Abandoned
- Battles/wars: World War II
- Events: Severe overcrowding and poor maintenance.

Airfield information
Runways
Direction	Length and surface
NE/SW	Gravel
NW/SE	Gravel

Leyburn Airfield is a former Royal Australian Air Force station located in Leyburn, Queensland. It was built in 1942 and operated until the end of World War II. The airfield is located 37 kilometres from Toowoomba in the Darling Downs region of southeast Queensland.

== History ==
In March 1942, the construction of Leyburn Airfield was proposed. The Australian War Cabinet approved work to commence on 8 May 1942. The construction of Leyburn Airfield followed the beginning of World War II, built to facilitate US heavy bombers in event of a Japanese invasion. This was done in the wake of the Battle of the Coral Sea.

=== Construction ===
All of Leyburn Airfield's facilities had been completed by April 1943, with a total infrastructure of buildings and services able to cater for 450 personnel. Leyburn Airfield post-war operated as an airbase for multiple RAAF squadrons until 200 Flight RAAF disbanded at the airfield in December 1945, resulting in the airfield's desertion.

In 1943, the airfield only operated 2 sealed runways installed in the Darling Downs countryside, and by July, was on a list of 17 unoccupied aerodromes situated within Queensland. The government intended to utilisation taxiways into hideout areas. Out of the 16 that had been partly constructed, all were eventually abandoned. The northern ends of the two runways were connected by a sealed taxiway at an estimated width of 15.2m, which could accommodate a variety of aircraft despite its initial purpose of servicing only heavy bomber planes.

=== World War II ===
Leyburn Airfield was constructed without any accommodation buildings, only a mess hall and kitchen in addition to ablution facilities and latrines. The airfield did not have any operational buildings on the site, nor any hangars, bomb stores or blast pens. The airfield had two 12,000 US gallons (45,000 L) capacity underground petrol tanks, which were installed by the mid-1944.

In April 1944 the US Army claimed that the Leyburn Airfield was completely developed by the efforts and resources supplied by the RAAF, and was also maintained, controlled, and operated by the RAAF. A map that was produced by the RAAF in June 1945 depicted a 138 degree runway that was a total of 5,350 feet long by 150 feet wide (approximately 1.63 km by 45.7m). In addition to another 36 degree runway that ran 7000 feet long by 150 feet wide (approximately 2.14 km by 45.7m). In 1945, the 138 degree runway was used solely for the parking of aircraft due to its poor condition. The 36 degree runway was in moderate condition. A graveled taxiway in poor condition ran from the camp to the southern end of the 36 degree runway during the same time period.

=== Overcrowding ===
Due to the poor condition of Leyburn Airfield, maintenance inspections had to be carried out by personnel from 14 Operational Base Unit (OBU) from a RAAF Station situated in Lowood in 1945. A Main Roads Board repair and maintenance party was stationed at the airfield between January and October 1945 in order to keep the runways at Leyburn serviceable.

The Airfield in Leyburn was host to many RAAF units between July 1944 and December 1945. The units consisted of 21 Squadron, 23 Squadron, 99 Squadron and 200 Special Duties Flight. All units stationed at Leyburn flew B-24 Liberator bombers. Both the No. 21 Squadron RAAF and No. 23 Squadron RAAF prior to B-24 Liberator bombers, flew Vultee Vengeance aircraft.RAAF Squadron 99 and 200 Special Duties Flight both in February 1945 formed at Leyburn Airfield.

By late February 1945, the Leyburn Airfield was crowded with an estimated number of personnel on site between 1,000 and 1,300. RAAF Squadron 99 was eventually moved to Jondaryan in March 1945 due to the overcrowding. Soon afterwards, 200 Special Duties Flight moved in, and was also the last to leave Leyburn due to the overcrowding, disbanding in December 1945.

== Units ==
The following units based at Leyburn Airfield.

- No. 21 Squadron RAAF, 1944 - 1945, equipped with Vultee Vengeance, later B-24 Liberator bombers.
- No. 23 Squadron RAAF, 1944 - 1945, equipped with Vultee Vengeance, later B-24 Liberator bombers.
- No. 99 Squadron RAAF, February 1945 - March 1945, equipped with B-24 Liberator bombers.
- No. 200 Special Duties Flight RAAF, February 1945 - December 1945, equipped with B-24 Liberator bombers.

== Post-war ==
Leyburn Airfield sat vacant for 2 years before the Australian Federal Government moved to close down the site. However, this proposal was contested in 1947 by the Warwick City Council in addition to the Rosenthal, Allora and Glengallan Shire councils who launched a joint protest to save the airfield which had a construction cost of £1,500,000. The site closure was later further contested by the Pittsworth Shire Council in 1948. Following the Department of Civil Aviation’s decision on classifying Leyburn Airfield as abandoned, the Federal Government sold the gravel on the runway which was its original goal.

In 1949, the airfield held the 1949 Australian Grand Prix. Two of its runways were used as the race track.
