= Steve Lubratich =

American baseball player (born 1955)

- Third baseman/Shortstop/Second baseman
- Born: May 1, 1955 (age 70); Oakland, California, U.S.
- Batted: Right Threw: Right

MLB debut
- September 27, 1981, for the California Angels

Last MLB appearance
- September 30, 1983, for the California Angels

MLB statistics
- Batting average: .209
- Home runs: 0
- Runs batted in: 8
- Stats at Baseball Reference

Teams
- California Angels (1981, 1983)

Steven George Lubratich /luːbraːtitɕ/, LU-brah-tich (born May 1, 1955) is an American former professional baseball player who played parts of two seasons in the Major League Baseball (MLB) with the California Angels.

== Playing career ==
Lubratich attended the University of California, Riverside, where he played college baseball for the Highlanders from 1976–1977. He signed with the Angels as an amateur free agent in 1977. He made his MLB debut as a pinch runner on September 27, 1981, against the Toronto Blue Jays. He appeared in seven games with California that season before spending the entire 1982 season in the minors. He made it back to the majors in 1983, hitting .218 in 57 games with the Angels. Lubratich's final MLB appearance was on September 30, 1983, against the Texas Rangers.

== Administrative career ==
Lubratich is currently a special assistant to the President of Baseball Operations and the General Manager with the Cleveland Guardians.

== More information ==
- Career statistics from Baseball Reference · Retrosheet · Baseball Almanac
