= Department of Main Roads (Queensland) =

Defunct government agency of Queensland, Australia

Department overview
- Dissolved: 2009
- Superseding Department: Department of Transport and Main Roads
- Jurisdiction: Queensland
- Headquarters: 477 Boundary Street, Spring Hill, Brisbane
- Minister responsible: Minister for Local Government and Main Roads

The Department of Main Roads was a department of the Government of Queensland responsible for planning, building and maintaining the state's major roads. It was merged with Queensland Transport to form the Department of Transport and Main Roads in April 2009. The Minister for Local Government and Main Roads was responsible for the department; Warren Pitt was the last person in this portfolio. The department's head office was at 477 Boundary Street in Spring Hill, Brisbane

The department was one of a handful of government agencies in Queensland with a permanent public museum. Situated in Toowoomba, the Heritage Centre showcases the story and culture of the department with a rich history; how hard work and a pioneering spirit have helped connect Queensland. The museum opened to the public in 2008.

The Department of Main Roads had a major projects section located at 260 Queen Street. Due to the state's population growth and growing use of the roads for mining in Australia many more projects are being planned and implemented across Queensland. Some current plans and strategies include the Warrego Highway Upgrade Strategy and the Bruce Highway Upgrade Strategy.

== See also ==
- Translink
- Transport in Brisbane
