= No. 99 Squadron RAAF =

Royal Australian Air Force squadron

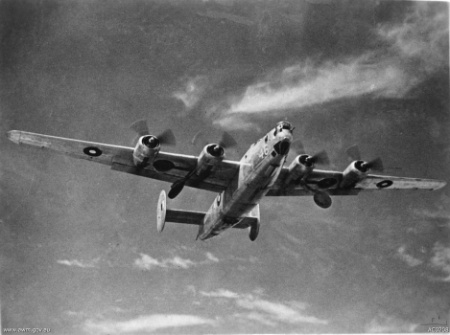
- A B-24 Liberator in RAAF service
- Active: 1 February 1945 – 5 June 1946
- Country: Australia
- Branch: Royal Australian Air Force
- Role: Heavy bomber
- Engagements: World War II

Insignia
- Squadron code: UX

Aircraft flown
- Bomber: B-24 Liberator

No. 99 Squadron was a Royal Australian Air Force (RAAF) heavy bomber squadron that was raised during World War II. Formed late in the war, the squadron ultimately did not see action as it became combat ready just as the war came to an end. After the war, it undertook general transportation duties before being disbanded in mid-1946.

== History ==
No. 99 Squadron was formed on 1 February 1945 at Leyburn, Queensland, as a heavy bomber squadron. The squadron's first commanding officer was Squadron Leader James Marshall. Personnel began marching in and by the end of the month, the squadron's strength had reached 17 officers and 394 other ranks. The squadron's B-24 Liberator bombers arrived in early March and the squadron was transferred to Jondaryan, Queensland, for further training.

In early April, Wing Commander Arthur Cross took over command of the squadron, which had grown in size to include 82 officers and 581 other ranks, equipped with a variety of aircraft: eight Liberators, as well as one Tiger Moth and one Avro Anson. That month the squadron was declared operational in April and it began moving to Darwin, Northern Territory, in May ahead of commencing combat operations. As the move continued, the squadron received another six Liberators. The squadron was still in the process of concentrating in Darwin when the war ended in August, with the move finally being completed in late September. As a result, the squadron did not see action against the Japanese.

Following the end of the war No. 99 Squadron operated in the transport role and was responsible for flying personnel and supplies between Darwin and southern Australia. The squadron suffered its first loss on 14 September when a Liberator crashed near RAAF Base Amberley, killing five crew members. Transport operations continued throughout October, with the squadron's aircraft transporting around 800 passengers, most of whom were recently liberated Allied prisoners of war, and large quantity of freight. In November, No. 99 Squadron moved from Darwin to Tocumwal, New South Wales, where, the following month, further losses were incurred when one member was killed and four injured in a vehicle accident on the ground. As the demobilisation process began, the squadron was warned out for disbandment in March 1946. In early May, command of the squadron passed to Flight Lieutenant B.S. Garvin. The squadron was finally disbanded on 5 June 1946.

== See also ==
- B-24 Liberators in Australian service
