= All-weather airfield =

All-weather airfields are terms used to describe a runway, that is operable in all conditions of weather such as rain and support low visibility. The term was commonly used during the European and Pacific theaters of World War II.

== History of all-weather runways ==
By the end of the 1920s, most major cities in the United States had built airports with paved all-weather runways. These airfields consisted of control towers and radio equipment under federal guidance.

During the invasion of France on D-Day, adequate meteorology was required to be recorded prior to air-raids. British and U.S. forecasters predicted a brief window of fair weather in the English Channel in which the Allied forces attacked. As the war progressed towards the Philippine Islands, a mobilisation of boats and planes was required which was susceptible to typhoons and monsoons. By 1945, the United States Army Air Forces constructed 900 weather stations, of which more than 600 were stationed outside the United States. Weather stations were also transferred to operations of The Signals Corp. In order to build an all-weather airfield, an area must be cleared of trees and other obstructions using machinery such as caterpillar tractors. Once the dirt runway had been leveled, engineers laid pieced steel planking or concrete to create an all-weather runway. Rollers would also smooth out any rough spots left by heavier equipment.

=== All-weather operations ===
During all-weather operations for an airfield, aircraft have the ability to take off and land in an airport under low visibility conditions, which means below 550m. During World War II, all-weather airfields were essential if the region commonly experienced torrential rainfall, and were also fully cleared of obstacles. These airfields were installed with year-round surfaces to handle adverse weather conditions, such as rain or frost. They were often constructed with materials like pierced steel planking, which could withstand medium and heavy bomber operations regardless of weather.

=== Fair-weather operations ===
During fair-weather operations for an airfield, it is typically designed to minimize the impact of prevailing winds on aircraft operations, especially for smaller aircraft. The classification is derived from a weather term implying no precipitation and no extreme conditions of clouds, visibility, or wind. During World War II, fair-weather airfields did not have facilities to support low visibility or heavy rain. These airfields were more temporary and faster to construct, using materials like compacted soil, burlap with asphalt (prefabricated hessian), or light steel mesh. These surfaces were suitable for dry conditions, but became problematic during rain, as they could turn muddy and unusable. Fair-weather airfields were primarily operated by fighters and tactical bombers.

== Usage in other countries ==
In other countries or air forces, there are different weather or operation terms for airfields.

=== Australia ===
During the 1940s, an “A” class airfield is applied by the Department of Civil Aviation when there are favorable winds and dry weather. For example, Wittenoom Gorge Airport located in Western Australia, was given this category.

According to the Royal Australian Air Force, a B-1 type airfield consists of a gravel runway greater than 800 yards long, and also no permanent facilities. A B-2 type airfield consists of a gravel runway with permanent facilities.

=== Pakistan ===
During the 1950s and 1960s, the Royal Pakistan Air Force classifies airfields into three categories; “A” that receives full maintenance and permanent facilities, and “C” that the runway is to be repaired on notice. Category “C” are commonly used on former RIAF airstrips constructed and abandoned after World War II. Category “B” refers to an airfield that receives maintenance; however, no permanent facilities. For example, the former Chota Sargodha Airfield was classified as “C”, and Miranshah Airfield as an “A”.

== See also ==
- Index of aviation articles
