= Tom Delaney (racing driver) =

Cyril Terence "Tom" Delaney (8 January 1911 – 31 August 2006) was a British sportsman and industrialist, perhaps best known in his later years for being the oldest licensed racing driver in the world, having competed in the same Lea-Francis car for more than three-quarters of a century from 1930 until just a few months before his death.

== Biography ==
Delaney's father was a pioneer in motorsport, having competed in the 1903 Paris-Madrid road race, and in 1910, having become the agent for the French manufacturer Delaunay Belleville he built a factory in Maida Vale, north London. After World War I he became managing director of Lea Francis, and in 1928 the young Tom accompanied the team's cars to Brooklands for testing and tuning in preparation for the first ever Ards Tourist Trophy race in Ireland. Delaney later joined the team in Ireland as a young pit manager and was thrilled to witness Kaye Don winning the TT in the Lea Francis, a car which Delaney then acquired.

In 1930, Delaney he won two trophies in his first year of competition, and quite a number thereafter, at venues such as Brooklands (he later became Vice-President of the Brooklands Society), Brighton Speed Trials, Shelsley Walsh, Chalfont, Prescott and Phoenix Park (leading the Irish GP for most of the way). He raced at many well-known circuits including Donington (he competed both in the inaugural meeting in 1933 and in 2005!), Castle Combe, Rockingham, Goodwood and Silverstone.

Apart from motor cars and aeroplanes (he was one of the first men to gain a pilot's licence at Brooklands), Delaney took over and greatly expanded his father's business, Delaney Gallay Ltd. They had five factories and employed 2,000 people. They were heat exchange engineers who supplied advanced heating and cooling systems for both aircraft and vehicles. Delaney Gallay components flew on Spitfires, Lancasters, Typhoons and many modern civil and military aircraft, including Concorde. The company Gallay still operates, and is based in Wellingborough. It is now part of the G&M Group.

In 2004, Delaney suffered a serious accident while racing at Silverstone where he was thrown out of his car, which then bounced off a barrier running him over. In hospital that evening he was told he had only injured his wrist, whereupon Delaney telephoned his mechanic to see if the car could be repaired for the next race.

In late 2005, Delaney received the Motor Sports Association's first ever "Lifetime Achievement" award to mark his 75 years of motor racing. His last race, at the age of 95, came at a VSCC meeting at Silverstone in April 2006; he had been invited to the Goodwood Revival meeting in early September, but died, after a short illness, just a few days before it was held.

Tom Delaney was featured in the BBC ONE Life documentary The Oldest Drivers in Britain, which was broadcast on BBC1 on 18 October 2006.
