= Lewes Speed Trials =

Coordinates: 50.88622°N 0.02738°W

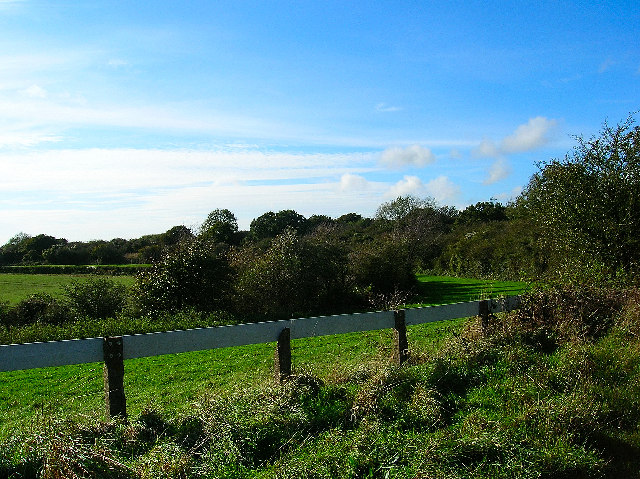
The racecourse used for the trials

The Lewes Speed Trials were speed trials held on a defunct course in Lewes, Sussex, England, sometimes known as "The Motor Road."

== History ==
The first meeting took place on 27 July 1924, on "a private road near Lewes", location unidentified. The event was organised by the Brighton & Hove Motor Cycle and Light Car Club, on a quarter-mile course. Fastest time of the day was set by J.A. Hall, Frazer Nash-GN, in a time of 16.6 secs.

"Speed trials were held on the Race Hill at Lewes three or four times a year from 1925 to 1939, at the instance of the Brighton & Hove MC, the Kent & Sussex LCC, the Bugatti Owners' Club and the Vintage Sports Car Club,..."

In 1933 The Autocar reported:

"The course bends slightly to the left, is one-third of a mile long, narrow, none too smooth, and slightly uphill. It leads directly off the London-Newhaven road just before reaching Lewes."

Jean Bugatti attended the races on 21 October 1933. Denis Jenkinson, motor racing journalist, attended his first motor sport event here in 1936. The Autocar reported from the meeting on 12 June 1937: "The first appearance in competition of the new four-wheel independent-suspension Atalanta was at Lewes. G.A.T. Weldon drove this 1½-litre model." Bill Boddy, editor of Motor Sport, drove the original HRG sports car, 1,497 c.c., at Lewes on 4 September 1937 with a best time of 27.4 sec, finishing third in the novices class. On 15 July 1939, Sydney Allard took a class win in a time of 22.12 secs.

== The Lewes Record ==
Comparisons of times recorded at different meetings and by different clubs are problematic. There were differences in the method of timing (the electric Bachelier method favoured by the Bugatti O.C. allowed the competitor to start in his own time) and even differences in the length of the course.

== Lewes Speed Trials past winners ==
Year	Driver	Vehicle	Time	Club	Notes
1932	R.G.J. Nash	Frazer Nash Terror	20.0 sec R	Kent & Sussex LCC	7 May
1932	N.W. Gardiner	Delage	22.7 sec	Bugatti O.C.	11 June
1932	R.G.J. Nash	Frazer Nash Terror	20.2 sec	Kent & Sussex LCC	18 June
1932	R.G.J. Nash	Frazer Nash Terror	21.0 sec	Kent & Sussex LCC	10 September
1933	R.G.J. Nash	Nash Special	21.0 sec	Kent & Sussex LCC	13 May
1933	R.G.J. Nash	Nash Special	21.0 sec	Kent & Sussex LCC	25 June
1933	R.G.J. Nash	Anzani-Nash Special	21.0 sec	Kent & Sussex LCC	9 September
1933	Richard Nash	Anzani-Nash The Spook	20.4 sec	Bugatti O.C.	21 October
1934	R.G.J. Nash	Anzani-Nash 1,496 c.c.	22.4 sec	Kent & Sussex LCC	12 May
1934	John Bolster	Bolster Special	20.2 sec	Kent & Sussex LCC	16 June
1934	R.G.J. Nash	Nash Special	21.6 sec	Kent & Sussex LCC	26 August
1934	Charles Martin	Bugatti 2.3	20.13 sec	Bugatti O.C.	8 September
1935	A.G. Bainton	Bugatti 1 1/2-litre		Kent & Sussex LCC	11 May
1935	S.E. Cummings	Vauxhall-Villiers S/C	19.4 sec R	Kent & Sussex LCC	15 June
1935				Kent & Sussex LCC	24 August
1935	S.E. Cummings	Vauxhall-Villiers S/C	18.13 sec R	Bugatti O.C.	7 September
1936	R.G.J. Nash	Frazer-Nash-Union Special	19.06 sec	Kent & Sussex LCC	9 May
1936	Robin Jackson	Alta 1,500 c.c. #17	19.18 sec	Kent & Sussex LCC	13 June
1936	A.G. Bainton	Bugatti 2.3-litre S/C	20.7 sec	Bugatti O.C.	15 August
1936	Geoffrey Taylor	Alta 1,488 c.c.	19.81 sec	Kent & Sussex LCC	22 August
1937	J. Lemon Burton	Bugatti 2.3-litre	19.12 sec	Kent & Sussex LCC	8 May
1937	Geoffrey Taylor	Alta	19.3 sec	Kent & Sussex LCC	12 June
1937	Geoffrey Taylor	Alta 2-litre	18.75 sec	Kent & Sussex LCC	21 August
1937	Arthur Baron	Bugatti 3,300 c.c. S/C	18.4 sec	Bugatti O.C.	4 September
1938	Arthur Baron	Bugatti 3,300 c.c.	18.61 sec	Kent & Sussex LCC	7 May
1938	John Bolster	Bolster Special	19.32 sec	Kent & Sussex LCC	11 June
1938	H. Whitfield-Semmence	Semmence-Special-A.C.	22.0 sec	Vintage S.C.C.	9 July
1938	Peter Monkhouse	E.R.A. 1 1/2-litre	18.27 sec R	Kent & Sussex LCC	20 August
1939	Norman Lewis	Bugatti 2,300 c.c.	18.47 sec	Kent & Sussex LCC	13 May
1939	Ned Lewis	Bugatti 2,300 c.c.	18.88 sec	Kent & Sussex LCC	17 June
1939	Stuart Wilton	M.G.	21.60 sec	Vintage S.C.C.	15 July
1939	Arthur Baron	Bugatti 3,300 c.c.	18.75 sec	Kent & Sussex LCC	19 August

Key: R = Course Record; S/C = Supercharged.

== See also ==
- Brighton Speed Trials
- Firle Hill Climb
- Prescott Speed Hill Climb

== Bibliography ==
- John Bolster, Specials, G.T. Foulis & Co Ltd, Reprinted 1971.
- Jeremy Wood, Speed on the Downs: Lewes Speed Trials 1924-39, JWFA Books, ISBN 0-9522766-1-5
