= Tom Delaney =

Tom Delaney may refer to:

- Tom Delaney (racing driver) (1911–2006), British sportsman and industrialist
- Tom Delaney (songwriter) (1889–1963), American blues and jazz songwriter, pianist and singer

== See also ==
- Thomas Delaney, Danish footballer
- Thomas A. Delaney, American lawyer and politician
