= Brighton Speed Trials =

Motor race in England

Coordinates: 50.817°N 0.123°W

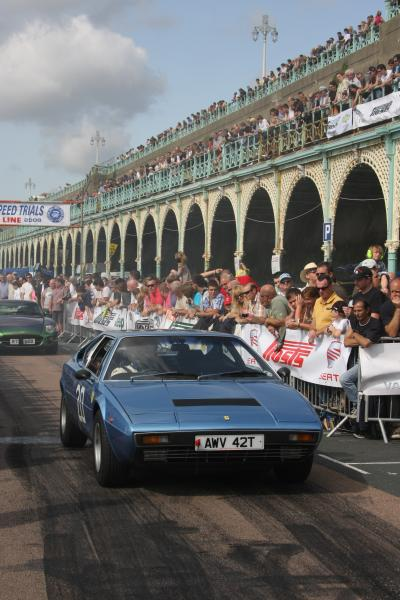
- Ferrari 308 GT4 at the Start Line in 2008
- Location: Brighton, England
- Owner: Brighton and Hove Motor Club
- Major events: Brighton Speed Trials

Sprint
- Length: 0.4 km (0.25 mi)
- Turns: 0
- Race lap record: 9.38 secs (John Siggery, Geronimo Dragster, 1971)

The Brighton Speed Trials, in full The Brighton National Speed Trials, is commonly held to be the oldest running motor race. The first race was held 19–22 July 1905 after Sir Harry Preston persuaded Brighton town council to tarmac the surface of the road adjacent to the beach between the Palace Pier and Black Rock to hold motor racing events. This stretch was renamed Madeira Drive in 1909 and the event is still held there, normally on the second Saturday of September each year. In 1936 Motor Sport described the event as: "undoubtedly the most important speed-trials on the British Calendar."

The event was run as a quarter mile sprint for both cars and motorcycles, held under the auspices of the Motor Sports Association. The event is organised by the Brighton and Hove Motor Club, with the Sprint Section of the Vintage Motorcycle Club in charge of the Motorcycles.

Following a fatal motorcycle combination crash in 2012 Brighton & Hove City Council considered banning the event. However, on 23 January 2014 the Economic Development and Culture Committee voted in favour of the event continuing. It was discontinued in 2024 due to high costs.

== History ==
The Brighton National Speed Trials is commonly held to be the oldest running motor race. The first race was held 19–22 July 1905 after Sir Harry Preston persuaded Brighton town council to tarmac the surface of the road adjacent to the beach between the Palace Pier and Black Rock to hold motor racing events. This stretch was renamed Madeira Drive in 1909 and the event is still held there, normally on the second Saturday of September each year. In 1936 Motor Sport described the event as: "undoubtedly the most important speed-trials on the British Calendar."

=== Interruptions ===
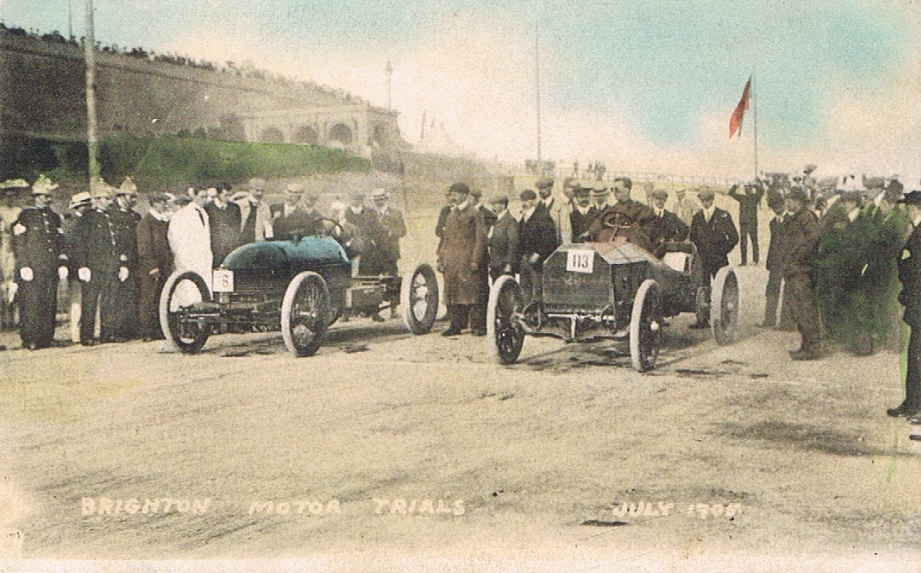
The first event, July 1905

The first speed trial, called the "Brighton Motor Trials", was held in July 1905, but because of the cost and opposition from ratepayers, it was not held again until 1923.

A police ban of racing on public roads interrupted activity from 1925–1931, but because Madeira Drive was a private road owned by the council it was eventually exempt from the ban.

The Speed Trials were not run between 1939–1945 due to World War II. The 1939 event had been scheduled for 23 September.

In 1969 the fuel crisis led to the cancellation of this year's event. Autocar reported in 1970: "Last year this traditional event did not take place because the condition of the road surface was thought unsuitable for the more powerful sprint cars."

In 2013 the council declined the club's application to run the event following a fatal accident in 2012. Following a Save Brighton Speed Trails campaign the event was reinstated in 2014.

=== Notable people ===
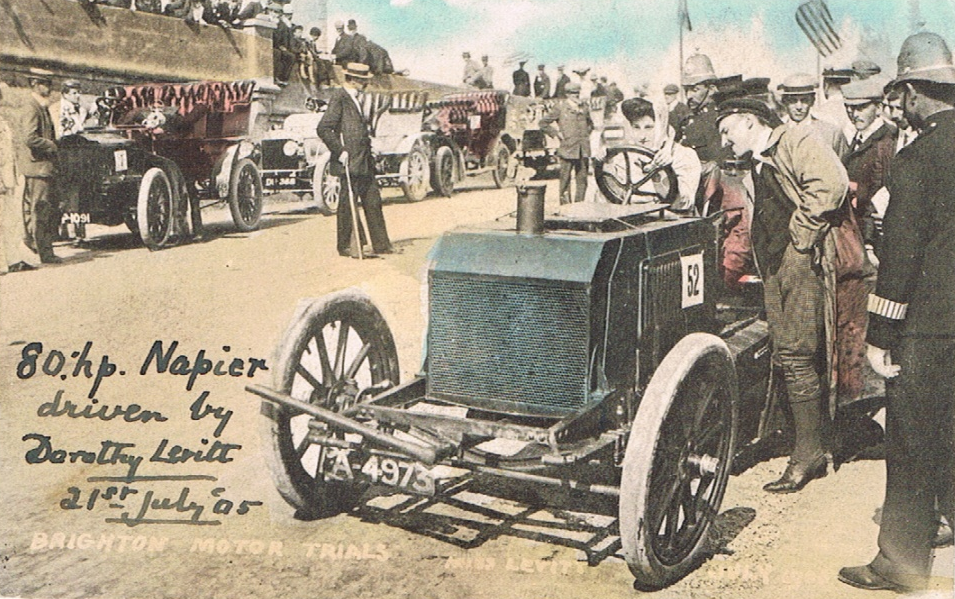
Miss Dorothy Levitt and her 80 hp Napier, 1905

- George Abecassis
- Sydney Allard
- Prince Bira
- Bill Boddy
- John Cobb
- Peter Collins
- John Cooper
- S. F. Edge
- Archie Frazer Nash
- Jack Fairman
- Joe Fry
- Bob Gerard
- Mike Hawthorn
- Earl Howe
- Alec Issigonis
- Denis Jenkinson
- Roy Lane
- Dorothy Levitt
- Tony Marsh
- Dean Moon
- Stirling Moss
- Reg Parnell
- Kay Petre
- Mike Pilbeam
- David Piper
- Dennis Poore
- Ian Raby
- Jack Sears
- Geoffrey Taylor
- Mickey Thompson
- Ken Tyrrell
- Peter Walker
- Rob Walker
- Peter Westbury
- Ken Wharton

=== The Dragster Era ===
The first announcement that a dragster would race in Brighton came from Wally Parks, in an editorial in Hot Rod Magazine in August 1958. Parks had nominated Calvin Rice to travel from the USA to England with the Hot Rod Magazine Special for the speed trials. In the event the trip was aborted.

In 1961 Sydney Allard built the Allard dragster in the UK and its first competitive appearance was at the Brighton Speed Trials on 2 September 1961. A new track record over the kilometre was anticipated but a fuel line ruptured caused a misfire and a time of 37.91 secs. Hot Rod Magazine reported: "During warmup it backfired and blew off one set of blower pipes and never got going." The reputation of the car never fully recovered, and Bill Boddy, editor of Motor Sport, called it a fiasco, saying the mechanical problems had also occurred in testing at Boreham. The Autocar described the Allard dragster as a "gallant failure."

At Brighton on 15 September 1962 the Allard dragster clocked two runs at 22.30 and 22.04 seconds. A respectable performance but no outright win or record. Motor Sport reported: "It appears that before the end of the Brighton kilometre the Allard dragster had burst the pipe between supercharger and engine, a common problem with such an installation and the reason why the Americans bolt their blowers on the engine, eliminating a long induction pipe."

Sydney Allard was joined on 14 September 1963, by Dante Duce in Dean Moon's Mooneyes gas dragster and Mickey Thompson with his Ford-powered Harvey Aluminum Special for some match-race style action. It was not to be. The American cars were not really suited to the kilometre, and there were no clocks for a quarter-mile distance. They had no brakes at the front and parachute brakes at the rear, no rear suspension, and advertising on the bodywork. All of this was enough to give the scrutineers (technical inspectors) fits. The cars did demonstrations only, reduced to burnouts and wheelstands, but left a lasting impression on the crowd. The Allard dragster put two rods through the block on Madeira Drive that day. The Worden dragster of Tony Densham and Harry Worrall, a budget effort powered by a Shorrock-supercharged 1,500 c.c. Ford engine, was entered in the 1,101 to 1,500 c.c. racing car class, and, although not geared for the kilometre, finished second to Patsy Burt, in a time of 27.86 sec. Densham would later set the British land speed record at Elvington in the Ford-powered Commuter dragster.

The canny Duce returned in 1964 with the Moonbeam modified sports car, which at least looked like a traditional European sporty car, but with a drag race and Bonneville heritage. The car as raced in Brighton was fitted with a 375-cubic inch supercharged Chevrolet V8 engine and a Devin bodyshell, and was originally built in 1959. Dante Duce also borrowed an A.C. Shelby Cobra, chassis number CSX2345, from John Wyer, and entered it in the GT class, car number 110 at Brighton. Duce cleaned up that day winning overall in the Moonbeam in a time of 21.95 sec, and first in Sports and GT cars over 2,500 c.c., in the Cobra roadster in 24.35 sec.

Soon Brighton started holding dragster demonstrations over the quarter mile. In 1972 Clive Skilton produced an 8.18 sec run in his rear-engined Chrysler dragster. In 1973 Dennis Priddle ran a smoky 7.69 sec quarter mile in his front-motored Chrysler dragster, which remains the quickest quarter yet seen on Brighton seafront. Motor Sport reported: "The sheer bravery and courage of the West Country lad as the Dragster accelerated along the bumpy, cambered road, brought forth the most incredible spontaneous round of applause heard at a motoring event for many years." It is said that the local police chief came to Priddle after the run and said "That was that most amazing thing I have ever seen and there's no way I am going to let you do it again!"

The dragsters were getting too quick for Brighton and there were concerns about how to deal with fires involving exotic fuels. They faded from the scene with only occasional wins by drag-race type vehicles, such as Shaun Saunders (2000) and Paul Marston (2001, 2002).

== Current events ==
The event is currently run as a quarter mile sprint for both cars and motorcycles, held under the auspices of the Motor Sports Association. The event is organised by the Brighton and Hove Motor Club, with the Sprint Section of the Vintage Motorcycle Club in charge of the Motorcycles. Entrants run individually, although in earlier days vehicles would race side by side. This practice was stopped following a number of accidents. The course length has varied over the years, generally becoming shorter to keep terminal speeds manageable as cars have got faster. The speed trials form a unique event, where vintage and exotic classics meet the latest in street and racing cars. Public access is allowed to the paddock and startline 'funnel' allowing visitors to get much closer to the action than at most events.

Following a fatal motorcycle combination crash in 2012 Brighton & Hove City Council considered banning the event. However, on 23 January 2014 the Economic Development and Culture Committee voted in favour of the event continuing, after a petition of more than 12,000 signatures was presented.

In 2024 the event was discontinued with losses being cited as the reason.

=== Timetable of events ===
Times are approximate.

Time	Event
0900-1130	Practice
1130–1300	Morning timed runs
1300–1400	Interval
1400–1800	Afternoon timed runs
1800–1900	Top six runoffs for cars and bikes
1900	Results declared and award presentation

=== Classes of cars ===
Handicap – Roadgoing cars of any type
Class 1 – Roadgoing and modified production cars up to 1400cc
Class 2 – Roadgoing and modified production cars over 1400cc and up to 2000cc
Class 3 – Roadgoing and modified production cars over 2000cc and up to 3500cc
Class 4 – Roadgoing and modified production cars over 3500cc
Class 5 – Clubmans
Class 6 – Sports Libre cars up to 1300cc
Class 7 – Sports Libre cars over 1300cc and up to 1600cc
Class 8 – Sports Libre cars over 1600cc
Class 9 – Racing cars up to 500cc
Class 10 – Racing cars over 500cc and up to 1100cc
Class 11 – Racing cars over 1100cc and up to 1600cc
Class 12 – Racing cars over 1600cc and up to 2000cc
Class 13 – Racing and Sports cars constructed on or before 31 December 1959

== Results ==
=== Track record ===
Car 1993, John Gray, SPA Judd V10, standing start 1/4-mile 8.90s

Bike 2009, Roger Simmons, Suzuki Hayabusa Turbo, standing start 1/4-mile 8.73s

Fastest Recorded 64ft Launch Time (Car) Laurie Hatchard Dax Rush Quadra 5 Litre V8 Special 1.61 Seconds 2022

=== Fastest time of the day ===
These are the fastest car times recorded on the day for each year.

Year	Driver	Vehicle	Time	Notes
Flying Start Kilometre
1905	Clifford Earp	Napier 90 hp	23s	19–22 July.
Standing Start 1/2 Mile
1923	J.A. Joyce	AC		14 July.
1924	Standing Start 1/4 Mile			
1924	G.N. Norris	Morgan	16.4s	25 May.
1924	Standing Start 1/2 Mile			
1924	J.A. Joyce	AC	28s	6 Sept.
Standing Start 1/2 Mile
1932	Sir Malcolm Campbell	Sunbeam Tiger S/C	23.6s R	17 Sep, very fine. "Pathe News Clip",
1933	Whitney Straight	Maserati	24.2s	16 Sep, very wet.
1934	R. O. Shuttleworth	Bugatti Type 51 S/C	23.8s	15 Sep, fine.
1935	R. O. Shuttleworth	Alfa Romeo P3 Tipo B S/C	22.68s R	14 Sep, fine.
1936	S. E. Cummings	Vauxhall-Villiers S/C	22.90s	26 Sep, wet.
1937	Geoffrey Taylor	Alta	22.84s	25 Sep, wet.
1938	Geoffrey Taylor	Alta 1960 c.c. S/C	22.45s R	2 July.
Standing Start Kilometre
1946	Raymond Mays	ERA R4D	24.47s R	7 Sep, fine.
1947	Raymond Mays	ERA R4D	24.27s R	1 Sep, fine.
1948	Raymond Mays	ERA R4D	23.86s R	4 Sep, fair, no motorcycles.
1949	Archie Butterworth	A.J.B.	24.91s	3 Sep, very fine.
1950	Raymond Mays	ERA R4D	24.40s	2 Sep, fine.
1951	Archie Butterworth	A.J.B.	26.63s	1 Sep, dry morning, wet afternoon.
1952	Ted Lloyd-Jones	Triangle Flying Saucer 21-litre	23.91s	6 Sep, fine.
1953	Ted Lloyd-Jones	Triangle Flying Saucer 21-litre	24.55s	5 Sept.
1954	Ken Wharton	ERA R4D	23.63s R	4 Sep, wet morning, dry afternoon.
1955	Ken Wharton	ERA R4D	23.99s	3 Sep, fine and dry.
1956	Ken Wharton	ERA R4D	23.34s R	1 Sept.
1957	Bill Sadler	Sadler Special-Chevrolet	25.44s	7 Sep, dry morning, wet afternoon.
1958	Jim Berry	ERA Special	25.01s	6 Sep, fine.
1959	Arthur Owen	Cooper-Climax 2-litre	23.50s	5 Sep, fine.
1960	Jim Berry	Cooper-ERA S/C	23.21s R	3 Sep, windy, wet morning, dry afternoon.
1961	Gordon Parker	HK Jaguar Special S/C	24.63s	2 Sep, fine.
1962	Chris Summers	Cooper F2-Chevrolet	21.69s R	15 Sep, sunny.
1963	Ken Wilson	BRM	23.10s	14 Sep, sunny.
1964	Dante Duce	Moonbeam-Chevrolet S/C	21.95s	12 Sept.
1965	Chris Summers	Lotus 24-Chevrolet	21.56s R	11 Sep, intermittent showers.
1966	Chris Summers	Lotus 24-Chevrolet	20.70s R	17 Sep, sunny.
1967	John Woolfe	AC Cobra 7-litre	22.51s	16 Sep, dry, calm, overcast.
1968	Patsy Burt	McLaren M3A-Oldsmobile	20.21s R	14 Sep, wet morning.
1969	No event			
Standing Start 1/4 Mile
1970	Gerry Tyack	Brabham BT23	12.89s R	12 Sept.
Standing Start Kilometre
1971	Johnty Williamson	Cooper T81B F1-1-67-Chrysler V8 7.2-litre	21.05s	11 Sept.
1972	Johnty Williamson	McLaren M10B 5.0 litre	22.42s	
1973	Bob Rose	McLaren-Chevrolet M14D	20.53s	8 Sept.
1974	David Purley	Trojan-Chevrolet T101	18.63s R	
1975	David Purley	Chevron B30-Ford GA V6 3.4-litre	19.70s	
1976	David Render	Lotus 76-DFV	18.77s	
1977	Simon Riley	Brabham-DFV BT33	18.28s R	10 Sept.
1978	Dave Harris	McRae-Chevrolet GM1	17.48s R	9 Sep, joint fastest.
1978	Terry Smith	Brabham-Repco BT36	17.48s R	9 Sep, joint fastest.
1979	Terry Smith	March-Repco 761	18.82s	8 Sept.
Standing Start 1/2 Mile
1980	Mark Williams	Hesketh-DFV 308E	15.49s R	13 Sept.
1981	Terry Smith	March-Repco 761	15.73s	12 Sept.
1982	Ken Ayers	March-DFV 79S	15.53s	11 Sept.
1983	Ken Ayers	March-DFV 79S	16.08s	10 Sept.
1984	Ken Ayers	Lyncar-DFL MS84	15.63s	8 Sept.
1985	Ken Ayers	Lyncar-DFL MS84	15.64s	14 Sept.
1986	Roy Woodhouse	March-Rover 77/82 T/C	18.71s	13 Sept.
1987	Clive Bracey	Vebra-Chevrolet	15.29s R	12 Sept.
1988	Clive Bracey	Vebra-Chevrolet Mk II 7.6-litre	14.98s R	10 Sept.
1989	Paul Edwards	Pilbeam-DFL MP58	14.97s R	9 Sept.
1990	Ken Ayers	Pilbeam-DFL MP58	15.32s	8 Sept.
1991	John Gray	Pilbeam-DFL MP58	14.48s R	14 Sept.
1992	John Gray	SPA Judd V10	14.48s	12 Sept.
Standing Start 1/4 Mile
1993	John Gray	SPA Judd V10	8.90s R	11 Sept.
1994	Les Edmunds	BRD TS01-Rover 4.5-litre	10.53s	
1995	Mike Lee	Lyncar 79B-BDG 2.0 litre	10.61s	9 Sept.
1996	David Render	Pilbeam-Hart MP43 2.8-litre	9.88s	
1997	Peter le Druillenec	Miller Exocet-Chevrolet 6.3-litre	10.20s	
1998	Richard George	Pilbeam MP62	10.68s	
1999	Tony Bianchi	Pilbeam MP62	10.92s	
2000	Shaun Saunders	Datsun 240Z-Chevrolet	10.25s	
2001	Paul Marston	Chrysler PT Cruiser "PT Bruiser" Dragster	10.41s	8 Sept.
2002	Paul Marston	Chrysler PT Cruiser "PT Bruiser" Dragster	10.17s	14 Sept.
2003	Philip Cooke	Force PC	10.25s	
2004	James Tiller	Allard J2-Chevrolet	10.20s	
2005	Mike Endean	Gould Ford Puma T/C	9.45s	
2006	James Tiller	Allard J2-Chevrolet	10.28s	
2007	Chris Cannell	Force SR8 2600 c.c.	10.33s	
2008	Mike Endean	Gould Ford Puma T/C	9.95s	
2009	Mike Endean	Gould Ford Puma T/C	9.63s	12 Sep, fine.
2010	Mike Endean	Gould Ford Puma T/C	10.63	11 Sep, intermittent light rain with short heavy showers.
2011	Rodney Thorne	Pilbeam MP 43	10.59	11 Sep, dry morning, wet afternoon.
2012	Rob Stevens	Force SR4	10.12	8 Sep, event ended early due to fatal accident.
2014	Rob Stevens	Force SR4	9.87	6 Sep, sunny and dry

Key: R = Course Record; S/C = Supercharged; T/C = Turbocharged.

=== Motorbikes fastest time of the day ===
Year	Rider	Motorcycle	Time	Miles per Hour (average)	Notes
Flying Start Kilometre
1905	Henri Cissac	Peugeot 12-h.p. twin cylinder	26.0		
Standing Start 1/2-mile
1924	E.W. Spencer	Douglas 494 c.c.	26.0	69.2 mph (111.4 km/h)	6 Sept.
1932	R.W. Storey	Brough Superior 996 c.c.	22.2	81.08 mph (130.49 km/h)	
1933	R.W. Storey	Brough Superior 996 c.c.	23.19	77.59 mph (124.87 km/h)	
1934	Noel Pope	Brough Superior	22.39	80.36 mph (129.33 km/h)	
1935	Eric Fernihough	Brough Superior J.A.P. 996 c.c.	20.27 R	88.7 mph (142.7 km/h)	
1936	E.C. Fernihough	Brough S/C	20.00 R	89.86 mph (144.62 km/h)	
1937	J. Waite	Norton 490 c.c.	25.13	73.20 mph (117.80 km/h)	
1938	F. Williams	Cotton 496 c.c.	23.22	77.51 mph (124.74 km/h)	
Standing Start Kilometre
1946	B. Berry	Brough-Superior	28.13		
1947	Bob Berry	Brough-Superior		86.17 mph (138.68 km/h)	.
1952	G. Brown	Vincent	24.71		.
1953	G. Brown	Vincent 998 c.c.	24.27		
1954	R. Charlton	Vincent	23.57 R		Absolute course record.
1955	R. Charlton	Vincent-H.R.D.	22.27	100.45 mph (161.66 km/h)	
1956 (i)	F. Williams	Norton-J.A.P.	22.4		
1957					
1958	Charlie Rous	Vincent streamliner	22.05	101.5 mph (163.3 km/h)	
1959	Basil Keys	Norton-J.A.P.	21.59 R	103.61 mph (166.74 km/h)	Absolute course record.
1960	C. Rous	Moto-Vincent	21.67	103.25 mph	
1961	Ernie Woods	Norton-J.A.P.	21.62	103.49 mph	
1962	G. Brown	Vincent Special Nero	20.99 R		Absolute course record.
1963	George Brown	Vincent Special Super Nero	19.29 R	115.96 mph (186.62 km/h)	
1964					
1965	I. Ashwell	Vincent 998 c.c. S/C	21.07		
1966	Ian Ashwell	Vincent Satan	19.34		
1967	Ian Ashwell	Vincent Satan S/C	19.47		
1968					
1969	No event				
Standing Start 1/4 Mile
1970					12 Sept.
Standing Start Kilometre
1971	Don East	Triumph 711 c.c. Quasimodo	20.05		
1972	Mick Butler		20.53		
1973	A. Weeden	Triumph 500 c.c. S/C	19.79		
1974	AWeeden	Triumph 500 c.c S/C	19.10	170.5 mph	
1975	Tony Weeden	Triumph 500 c.c.	18.95	173.5 mph	
1978	Henk Vink	Kawasaki 1,000 c.c. S/C Big Spender III	17.48 R		
Standing Start 1/2-mile
1980	A. Weeden	Triumph 499 c.c.	16.45	109.42 mph (176.09 km/h)	
1982	Pip Higham	Suzuki Katana	15.13 R		
Standing Start 1/4-mile
1994	Jeff Dowsett	Suzuki GSX 1,260 c.c.	9.62		
1995	Dave Holland	Suzuki GSXR 1,400 c.c.	9.31 R		1996 Dave Hughes Suzuki GSX 1328 turbo
1997	Dave Hughes	Suzuki 1,326 c.c.	9.38		2000 Dave Hughes Suzuki 1326 turbo / nitrous 9.0 / 151 "R"
2001	Dave Holland		9.25		8 Sept.
2004	Phil Wood	Suzuki Katana	8.87		
2009	Roger Simmons	Suzuki Hayabusa Turbo	8.73 R		12 Sep, fine.
2010	Steve Walton	Suzuki GSXR1000	10.60	143 mph (230 km/h) terminal speed	11 Sep, Wet.
2011	Steve Walton	Suzuki GSXR1000	10.71		11 Sep, dry morning, wet afternoon.
2012	Craig Mallabone	Suzuki Hayabusa Turbo	8.85		8 Sep, event ended early due to fatal accident.
2014	Craig Mallabone	Suzuki Hayabusa Turbo	9.07		6 Sep, sunny and dry

Key: R = Course Record; S/C = Supercharged.

== See also ==
- Firle Hill Climb
- Lewes Speed Trials
- Southport Speed Trials
- London to Brighton Veteran Car Run

== Bibliography ==
- Split Seconds – My Racing Years, Raymond Mays "ghosted" by Dennis May, G.T. Foulis & Co. Ltd. 1952. 306 pages.
- Sprint: Speed Hillclimbs and Speed Trials in Britain: 1899–1925, T.R. Nicholson, (Timothy Robin), 1930–, Newton Abbot, David & Charles, 1969.
- Richard Shuttleworth: An Illustrated Biography, Kevin Desmond, Jane’s Publishing Co Ltd., 1982.
- The Brighton National Speed Trials in the 1960s, 1970s & 1980s (2004) Tony Gardiner, Veloce Publishing ISBN 1-903706-88-2.
