= ERA R4D =

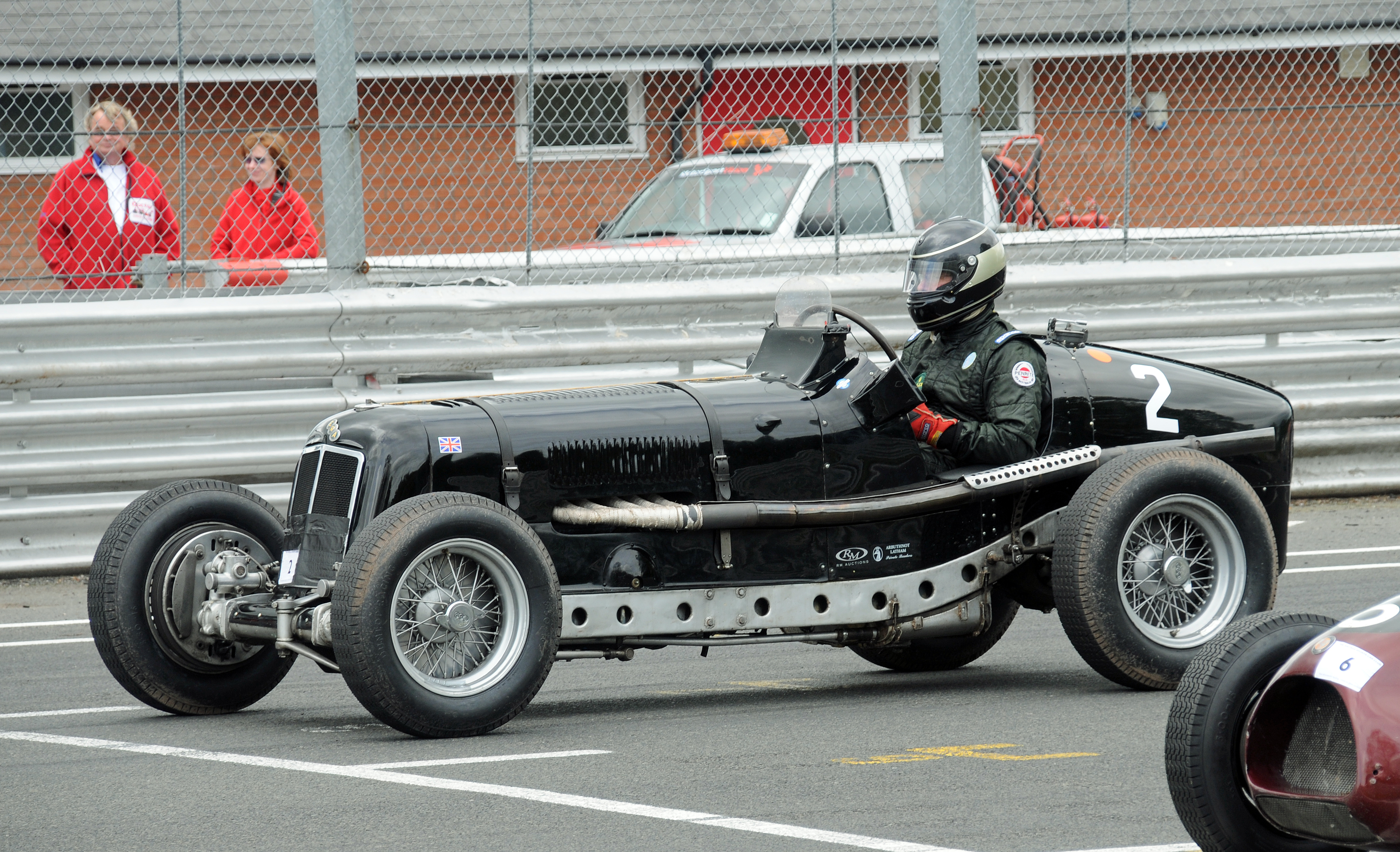
ERA R4D, pictured in historic competition in 2009

The ERA R4D, built by English Racing Automobiles, is the last development of this classic voiturette racing car, the only D-Type ever built. Originating as R4B in 1935, the car was rebuilt as a C-Type by modifying the front end of the chassis frame to accommodate independent Porsche-type torsion bar front suspension. Over the winter of 1937-38 the car was given a completely new fully boxed frame, and was designated R4D.

As the first ERA to be fitted with a Zoller supercharger (in 1935), R4D accumulated a formidable competition record in its various guises, finally being purchased from the works by Raymond Mays, one of ERA's founders, and running as a privately entered car in 1939. Mays set numerous pre-war records in R4D, including Prescott and Shelsley Walsh hill climbs, Brighton Sprints and Brooklands Mountain Circuit. Mays describes his history with the car in his book Split Seconds.

After World War II R4D continued in active competition, but the demands on Mays's time created by the evolving BRM project meant he competed less frequently. In 1952 Mays sold R4D to Ron Flockhart. In 1953 Flockhart had a phenomenally successful season, winning the Bo'ness hill climb in a record setting 33.82 seconds. The car was featured on the cover of Autosport magazine. This success led to his joining the BRM team as a works driver, and later successes at Le Mans and elsewhere.

In 1954 Ken Wharton purchased R4D from Flockhart and used the car to win the RAC Hill Climb Championship. In 1955 he used R4D and his Cooper to finish equal first in the hill climb championship with Tony Marsh. Since Wharton was a multiple previous winner, the RAC awarded the championship to newcomer Marsh.

An achievement of R4D in the post-war era is that it has won the Brighton Speed Trials seven times, driven by Raymond Mays four times and Ken Wharton three times, more wins than any other car at this event. The owner after Ken Wharton was the pseudonymous "T. Dryver," creator of the aero-engined De Havilland-M.G. Special. He raced the ERA in the Brighton Speed Trials in 1957 but his chance of achieving fastest-time-of-the-day was spoiled by rain.

From the mid-fifties onward, the car had a variety of owners, but achieved notable success in historic racing in the hands of Neil Corner and Willie Green (the latter driving for Anthony Bamford). R4D rose to pre-eminence again in the hands of Anthony Mayman, achieving many successes and setting many pre-war class records at various venues. In recent years the car has been owned and driven by James Mac Hulbert, and continues to be one of the most successful pre-war racing cars still active in competition, having set new pre-war class records at numerous venues. Madge Hulbert sold the car to Brian Fidler in late 2015, and Nick Topliss drives it in competition. For a full history of this remarkable car see J. Mac Hulbert (2016). ERA. Porter Press. ISBN 978-1-907085-40-6..

== Sources ==
- Split Seconds: My Racing Years by Raymond Mays "ghosted" by Dennis May, G.T. Foulis & Co. Ltd. 1952.
- Motor Sport
- Autosport
- Hulbert, J. Mac (12 October 2016). ERA. Porter Press. ISBN 978-1-907085-40-6.
