= BHRA =

BHRA may refer to:

- Brooklyn Historic Railway Association
- British Hydromechanics Research Association, later known as BHR Fluid Engineering
- British Hot Rod Association
- British Hotels and Restaurants Association
