= Bill Boddy =

British motorsport journalist (1913–2011)

Bill Boddy MBE
- Born: William Charles Boddy; 22 February 1913; Wandsworth, London, England
- Died: 7 July 2011 (aged 98); Radnorshire, Powys, Wales
- Occupations: Motorsport journalist Author
- Years active: 1930–2011
- Known for: Editor; Motor Sport magazine

William Boddy, MBE (22 February 1913 – 7 July 2011) was a British journalist who was the editor of Motor Sport from 1936 to 1991. After 1991 he still contributed regularly to Motor Sport magazine, continuing a career that lasted eighty-one years. He also co-founded the Vintage Sports Car Club, and founded the Brooklands Society in 1967 among numerous contributions to the emerging vintage car scene. At his death he was considered the longest-serving journalist in the UK, having submitted his first article in 1930 and his last one just a week before his death.

== Early years and racing career ==
Boddy was born in Wandsworth, London in 1913, to a Welsh mother and an English father who would shortly be killed in World War I. He became interested in cars from an early age and began to build up an encyclopaedic knowledge of motoring, leaving school in 1928 and immersing himself in automotive publications and the Brooklands racing scene.

In tandem with his journalistic work, Boddy drove the original HRG 1,497 cc (91.4 cu in) sports car at the Lewes Speed Trials on 4 September 1937 with a best time of 27.4 sec, finishing third in the novices class. Boddy entered his Lancia at the Prescott opening rally on 10 April 1938; his 1924 Aston Martin being commended by the judges in the Best Kept Car Competition. He also entered the Lancia 1,352 cc (82.5 cu in) at the first Prescott speed hillclimb on 15 May 1938. Boddy was riding as passenger when Sydney Allard won the last speed event to be held in England prior to World War II. Having set the fastest time at the Horndean Speed Trials, their car overturned past the finish line and both occupants were thrown clear and uninjured.

== Journalism ==
Boddy's first published article, in Motor Sport in 1930, was on the history of the Brooklands track, where he had first gone in 1927. He worked with Brooklands Track & Air for two and half years from 1931, and was appointed editor of the struggling Motor Sport in 1936. He wrote under the initials W.B., as company policy insisted that full names could not be used as bylines, though his identity was common knowledge.

Throughout World War II he was employed by the Ministry of Aircraft Production at Farnborough working on Air Publications, but he kept Motor Sport going in his spare time for the duration. After the war, he recruited Denis Jenkinson for Motor Sport to provide race reports. In February 1946 Motor Sport published a four-page "Obituary" for the Brooklands circuit, with the headline: "Built at his own expense for the nation's good, by the late Mr. H. F. Locke King - 1906. Betrayed by bureaucracy and declared an industrial area - 1946."

A Brooklands expert, he wrote the authoritative histories of the track and in 1967 founded the Brooklands Society, later the Brooklands Trust Members, to preserve the remains of the track and its facilities. He also made a reputation for road tests that pulled no punches, often incurring the wrath of manufacturers and advertisers. He is considered a driving force behind the creation of the vintage car movement, each edition of Motor Sport providing unique coverage of vintage cars and events. He was a veteran of 39 London to Brighton Runs.

His editorship was also notable for his campaigns on motoring issues, such as against the 70 mph speed limit.

Boddy retired as editor in 1991, though he continued to contribute to the magazine until his death in Powys, Wales in 2011, having been awarded an MBE in 1997 for his contributions to journalism. He was survived by three daughters and had lived alone after the 1998 death of his wife Winifred Holbrook, whom he had married in 1948.

== Bibliography ==
In addition to his prolific magazine work, William Boddy wrote numerous books including:

- Boddy, William (1948). The Story of Brooklands, The World's First Motor Course. Vol. 1. London, GB: Grenville Publishing Company, Ltd.
- Boddy, William (1949). The Story of Brooklands, The World's First Motor Course. Vol. 2. London, GB: Grenville Publishing Company, Ltd.
- Boddy, William (1950). The Story of Brooklands, The World's First Motor Course. Vol. 3. London, GB: Grenville Publishing Company, Ltd.
- Boddy, William (1951). The World's Land Speed Record. Tarporley, GB: Motor Racing Publications, Ltd.
- Boddy, William (1951). Continental Sports Cars. London, GB: G. T. Foulis.
- Boddy, William (1957). The History of Brooklands Motor Course. London, GB: Grenville Publishing Company, Ltd. (Compilation of the original three volumes.)
- Boddy, William (1960). The Bugatti Story. New York, NY: Sports Car Press.
- Boddy, William (2006) [1962]. Montlhéry : the story of the Paris autodrome. Dorchester: Veloce. ISBN 978-1-84584-052-5. OCLC 70128520.
- Boddy, William (1961). The Sports Car Pocketbook. London, GB: B. T. Batsford Ltd.
- Boddy, William (1971). The Vintage Years of the Morgan Three Wheeler. London, GB: Grenville Publishing Company, Ltd. ISBN 0903243008.
- Boddy, William; Laban, Brian (1977). The History of Motor Racing. London, GB: MacDonald Orbis. ISBN 0356151212.
- Boddy, William (1982). Volkswagen Beetle: Type 1, the traditional Beetle. London, GB: Bloomsbury Publishing. ISBN 9780850454390.
- Boddy, William (1982). My Thirty Years of Motoring for Motor Sport. London, GB: Grenville Publishing Company, Ltd.
- Boddy, William (1983). Mercedes Benz 300 S.L.: Gull-Wing and Roadster; 3 Litre, 6 Cylinder. Oxford, GB: Osprey Publishing Co. ISBN 0850455014.
- Boddy, William (1984). Great Cars. Multimedia Publications (UK) Ltd. ISBN 1851060006.
- Boddy, William (1992). Aero-Engined Racing Cars at Brooklands. London, GB: J. H. Haynes & Co., Ltd. ISBN 0854298673.
- Boddy, William (1999). Volkswagen Beetle: Type 1 and the New Generation (Osprey Expert Histories). Osceola, WI, US: Motorbooks International. ISBN 1855328852.
- Boddy, William (1995). Brooklands Giants. London, GB: J. H. Haynes & Co., Ltd. ISBN 0854299602.
- Boddy, William (2002). Brooklands: The Complete Motor Racing History. Tarporley, GB: Motor Racing Publications, Ltd. ISBN 1899870563.
