= Brighton and Hove Motor Club =

The Brighton and Hove Motor Club (BHMC) is best known as organiser of the Brighton Speed Trials.

== History ==
The club's origins date to the early 1920s when it was known as the Brighton and Hove Motor Cycle and Light Car Club. The earliest known reference to the Brighton and Hove Motor Club dates from 3 October 1925. On 12 January 1926 the sixth Annual General Meeting was held at the Royal Albion Hotel, Brighton. The Motor Cycle interests were split off in 1932.

During the 1920s the club organised speed trials at Lewes, there being no Brighton Speed Trials in the years 1925-1931. In 1926 the Brighton to Beer Trial for the Mayor's Cup was scheduled for 26/27 June. In 1927 there was a proposal to build a motor racing circuit on the Downs at Portslade, near Brighton. C. Laurence Clayton, who was secretary of the BHMC, also acted as Secretary for the track management, Brighton and Hove Motor Racing Club Ltd. The track was never built. On 5 September 1931 the club held an informal race meeting at Brooklands. The plan to build the Brighton road circuit was revived in 1934 but did not succeed. In 1938 The Autocar reported: "The Brighton-Beer Trial organised by the Brighton and Hove club has become a classic." Among the competitors that year was Sydney Allard, who gained a First Class Award. The 1939 Brighton Speed Trials were scheduled for September 23, but were cancelled due to the outbreak of war.

After World War Two the club was eager to stage competitive events. Early in 1945: "The possibilities of a post-war hill climb, which Robert Waddy of "Fuzzy" fame has been asked to investigate and the continuation of the Brighton Speed Trials were discussed at the annual general meeting." The venue investigated was Clayton Tunnel Hill, to the north of Brighton and about one mile in length, but the plan went nowhere. The club organised a hill climb at Stanmer Park, Brighton, Sussex, on 5 June 1948. The event was won by Bob Gerard, driving an ERA, but he crashed beyond the finish line and no more events were held there.

In 1948 the club moved into premises in the arches under Dukes Mound on the seafront at Brighton and have remained there ever since.

== Regular events ==
As well as the Speed Trials, the club organises other car related and social events.

Month	Event
January	Visit to Autosport Show
April	Annual General Meeting
May	Jolly - a social day trip
June	Classic and Concours Car Show
August	Goodwood Sprint
September	Brighton Speed Trials
December	Dinner Dance

== See also ==
- Lewes Speed Trials
