= Prescott, Gloucestershire =

Civil parish in Gloucestershire, England

Coordinates: 51.962207°N 2.0171746°W

Prescott
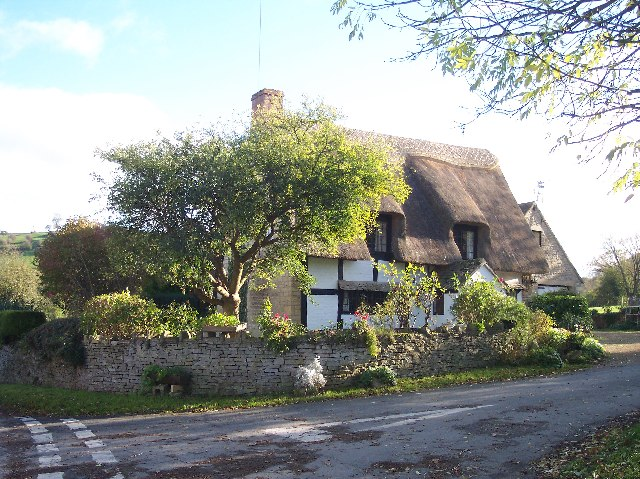
- Pardon Hill Cottage

- Location within Gloucestershire
- Civil parish: Prescott
- District: Tewkesbury
- Shire county: Gloucestershire
- Region: South West
- Country: England
- Sovereign state: United Kingdom
- Post town: Cheltenham
- Postcode district: GL54

Prescott is a settlement and civil parish in the Cotswolds within the English county of Gloucestershire. There are scattered farms and houses. There may once have been a settlement around the chapel.

Prescott Speed Hill Climb is a motor sport event held in the parish.

== History ==
Within the parish is Nottingham Hill Camp a promentary hill fort which was occupied during the Iron Age, Romano-British and possibly Anglo-Saxon periods. It has been scheduled as an ancient monument.

The estate was the property of Tewkesbury Abbey until the dissolution of the monasteries. It was then sold and became part of the Stanway estate. There is some archaeological evidence that there may once have been a settlement around the chapel.

Pardon Hill Farm is a 17th-century timber-framed farmhouse. It has a 19th-century ice house, and 18th century workshop.

Prescott House was enlarged by Edward Law, 1st Earl of Ellenborough around 1860 in Tudor Gothic style. Nearby are two stone monoliths each 2 metres (6 ft 7 in) high.

== Events ==
The Prescott Speed Hill Climb takes place here. The site was purchased in 1937 by the Bugatti Owners' Club and the site includes the Bugatti Trust Museum. The races are organised by the Vintage Sports-Car Club.

== Religious sites ==
There is a 12th-century chapel of ease which is a Grade II* listed building. It may have been dependent on the church at Winchcombe.
