= British Hot Rod Association =

The British Hot Rod Association (BHRA) was formed on September 1, 1960, by the amalgamation of a number of sprint racing clubs by Brian Coole, American Lee Siebenthaler and Vic Outen. It was established to unify the clubs, and organised drag races at disused airfields like Duxford Aerodrome and RAF Graveley Royal Air Force station and ran the first British drag racing meeting.

In 1967, it was wound up and members joined the British Drag Racing Association which then become the British Drag Racing & Hot Rod Association.

The name of the British Hot Rod Association was revived in 1994 as a hot rod and custom car club in the Medway and north-west Kent area.
