= Raymond Mays =

British racing driver (1899–1980)

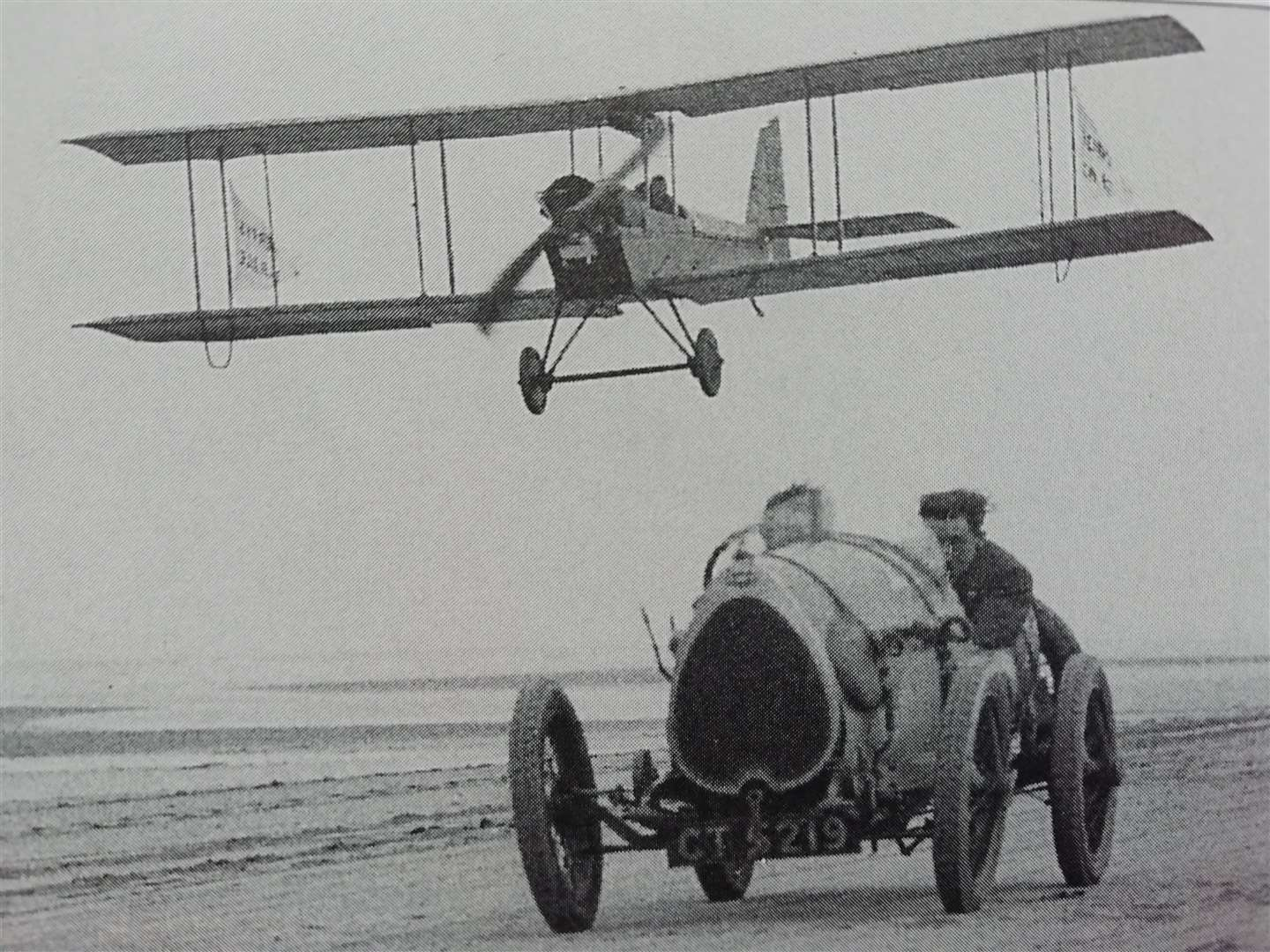
Mays racing a plane at Skegness Sands, 1923

Thomas Raymond Mays CBE (1 August 1899 – 6 January 1980) was an auto racing driver and entrepreneur from Bourne, Lincolnshire, England.

He attended Oundle School, where he met Amherst Villiers, leaving at the end of 1917. After army service in the Grenadier Guards in France, he attended Christ's College, Cambridge, taking his first win at Brooklands while an undergraduate.

== Racing career ==
Mays was one of the principal people behind the development of the motor racing stables of English Racing Automobiles (ERA) and British Racing Motors (BRM). The workshops of each firm were established, in turn, behind the family home on Eastgate Road in Bourne.

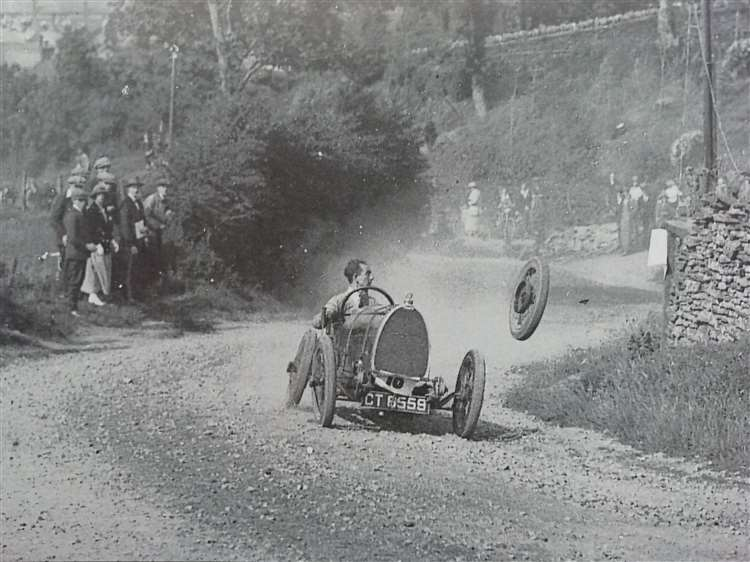
Mays losing a wheel during the Caerphilly Hill Climb, 1924

Mays raced for some thirty years, competing in various cars: a Speed-model 1½-litre Hillman, two 1½-litre Bugattis, an unsuccessful supercharged AC, the Vauxhall-Villiers, Mercedes, Invictas, Rileys and ERAs. Mays was renowned for competing at Shelsley Walsh, racing there in the early 1920s with a pair of Brescia Bugattis, known as 'Cordon Bleu' and 'Cordon Rouge'. He developed his cars with superchargers through Amherst Villiers and this association continued from AC to the Vauxhall-Villiers and then the famous 'White Riley', that eventually became the starting point for ERA.

In 1929, Raymond Mays entered the Vauxhall-Villiers at Shelsley Walsh fitted with twin rear wheels; according to Mays "the first time that any car had competed at any hill climb so equipped." He broke the hill record and this innovation was widely copied in the years to come.

Mays made his mark on the track in such events as the 1935 German Grand Prix (scene of a famous victory of Tazio Nuvolari), sharing his ERA with Ernst von Delius. The ribbon which came with the wreath which was part of the prize for this event is to be seen at the Raymond Mays room in Bourne Heritage Centre. Reflecting on his career in his 1969 Desert Island Discs appearance, he considered his favourite race to be his victory earlier in the same year in the voiturette class of the Eifelrennen, beating such entries as the private ERA of Dick Seaman to take the chequered flag.

Mays was one of ERA's most notable drivers, winning the British Hill Climb Championship in its first two years, 1947 and 1948 and also the Brighton Speed Trials in 1946, 1947, 1948 and 1950 in his black ERA R4D. Mays was initially entered in the first ever Formula One World Championship race, the 1950 British Grand Prix, but his registration was cancelled before the start of the event. He stopped driving racing cars at the end of the 1950 season.

In the 1950s and 1960s Mays produced and marketed tuning equipment for British Ford four- and six-cylinder engines, including an alloy cylinder head designed by Mays's ERA and BRM associate Peter Berthon. These parts were fitted to Ford, A.C., and Reliant cars. Mays described these events and others to Roy Plomley in Desert Island Discs on 25 October 1969. Mays wrote three books, Split Seconds, BRM and At Speed.

== In popular culture ==
The famous picture of Mays losing a wheel at Caerphilly in 1924 was used by French alternative rock band Roadrunners for the cover of their 1993 album Instant Trouble. The Wetherspoons pub in Bourne is named after him.

== Racing record ==
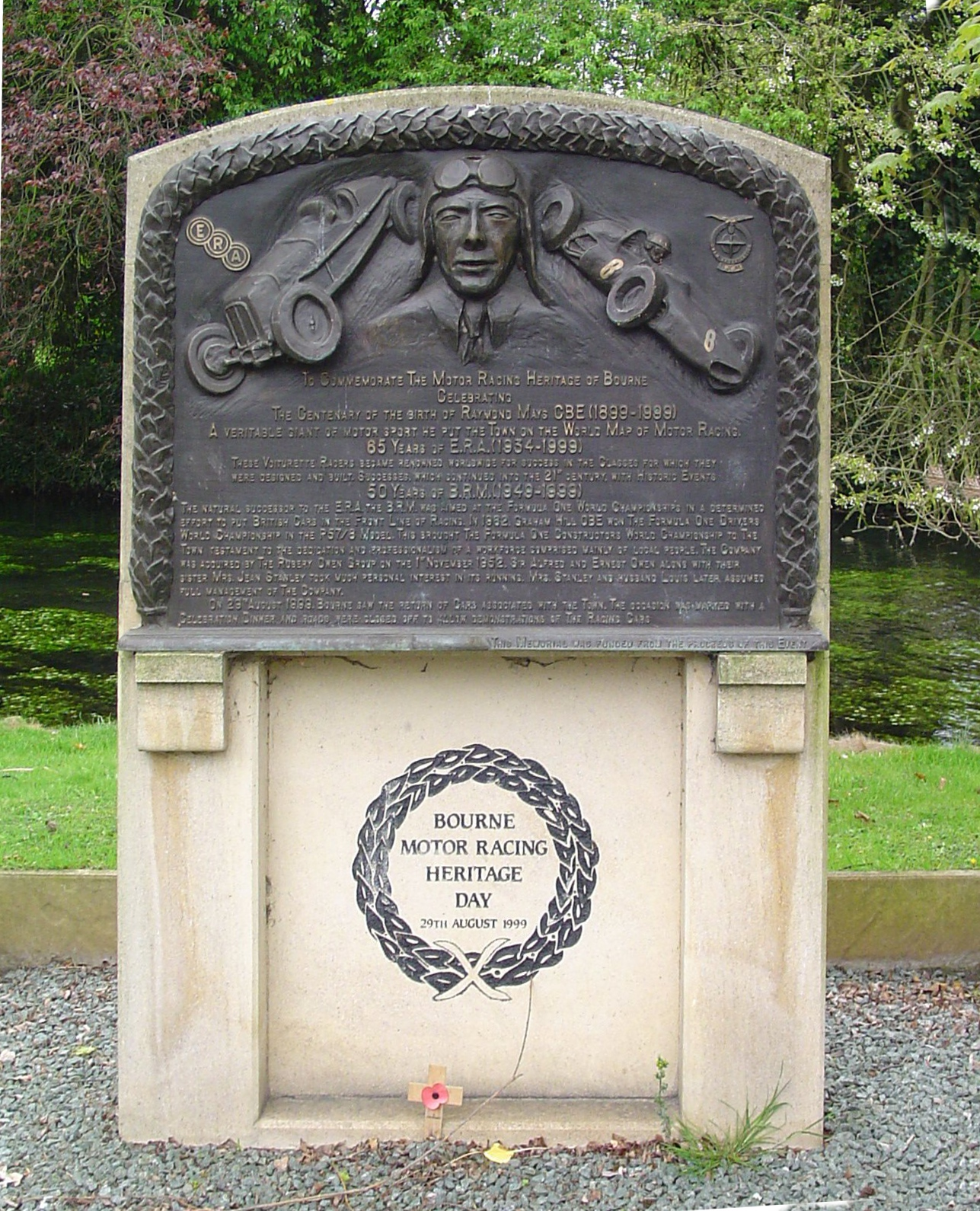
Motor Racing Memorial in Bourne

=== Complete European Championship results ===
(key) (Races in bold indicate pole position) (Races in italics indicate fastest lap)

Year	Entrant	Chassis	Engine	1	2	3	4	5	6	7	EDC	Pts
1935	H. W. Cook	ERA B	ERA 2.0 L6	MON	FRA	BEL	GER; Ret	SUI	ITA	ESP	29th	53
1939	Automobiles Talbot-Darracq	Talbot MC	Talbot 4.5 L6	BEL	FRA; Ret	GER	SUI				30th	31

== Bibliography ==
- Split Seconds: My Racing Years by Raymond Mays "ghosted" by Dennis May, G.T. Foulis & Co. Ltd. 1951. 306 pages.
- B.R.M. by Raymond Mays and Peter Roberts. (Cassell & Co. Ltd., 35, Red Lion Square, London W.C.1. 30s.) 1962. 240 pages.
- Kenny, Paul (2009). The Man Who Supercharged Bond: The Extraordinary Story of Charles Amherst Villiers (Hardback). Sparkford: Haynes Publishing. ISBN 978-1-84425-468-2.
- ERA R4D - The Autobiography of R4D by Mac Hulbert

Sporting positions
Preceded by None	British Hill Climb Champion; 1947–1948	Succeeded by Sydney Allard
