= Prescott Speed Hill Climb =

Coordinates: 51.96488°N 2.02615°W

Prescott
- Location: Prescott, Gloucestershire, England
- Time zone: GMT
- Opened: 1938
- Major Events: British Hill Climb Championship
- Hill Length: 1,128 yards (1,031 m)
- Hill Record: 34.60 seconds (Matthew Ryder, 2024, British Hill Climb Championship)

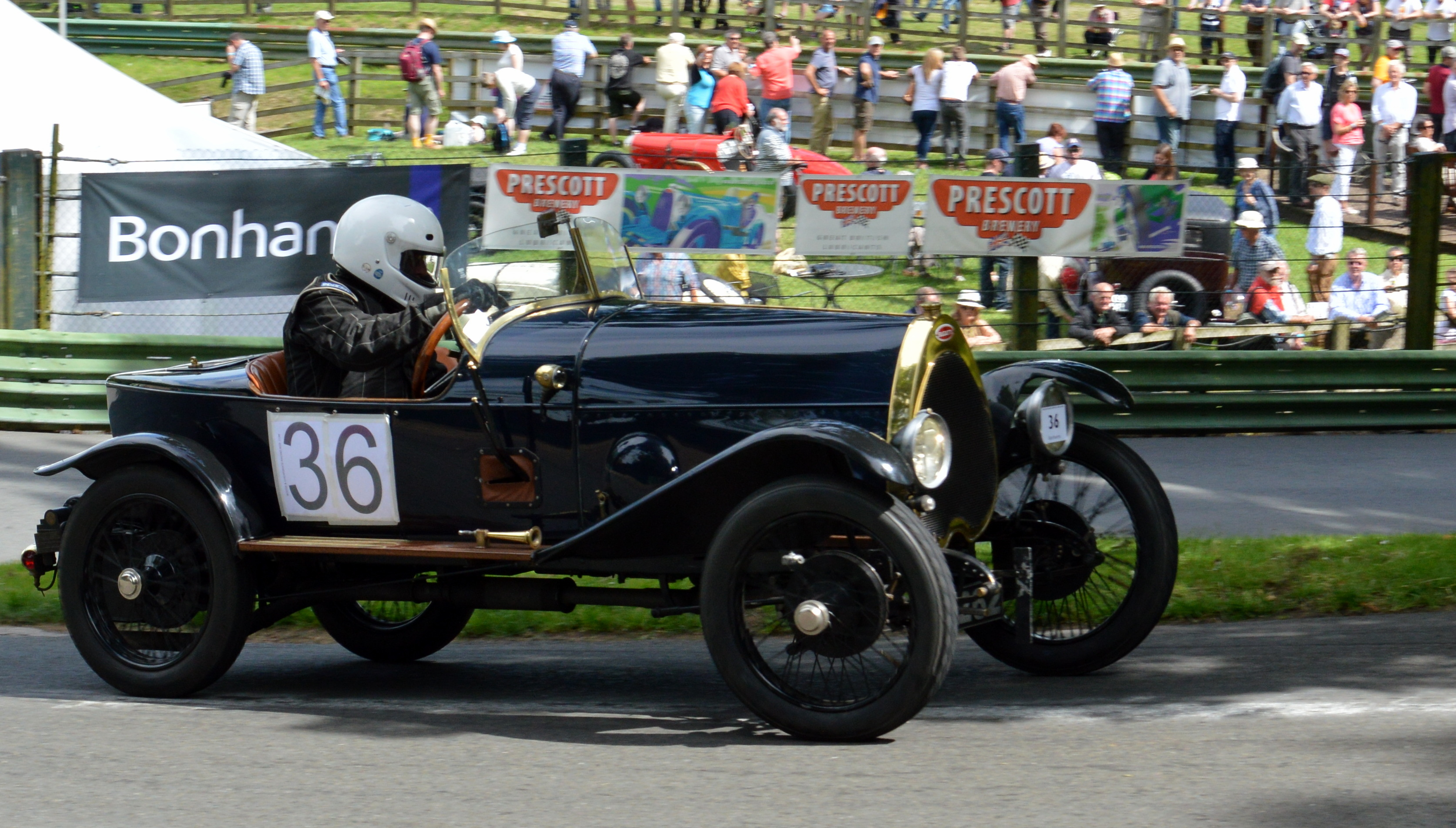
1922 Bugatti T22

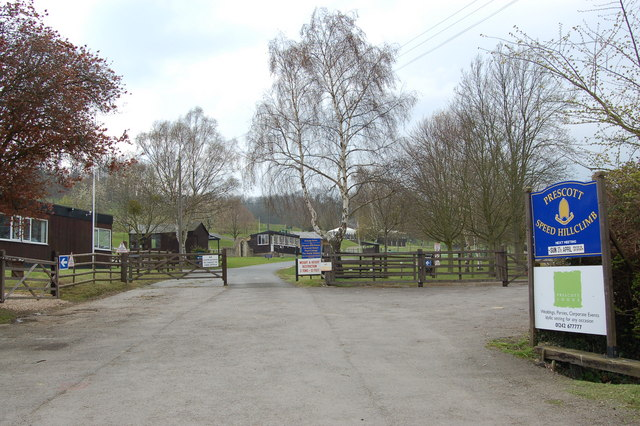
Prescott Speed Hill Climb entrance

Prescott Speed Hill Climb is a hillclimb in Gloucestershire, England. The course used for most events (the "Long Course") is 1,128 yards (1,031 m) in length, and the hill record is held by Matthew Ryder who took the outright hill record in a 4.0L Judd V8 powered Gould GR59 single seater with a time of 34.6 seconds on Sunday 18 August September 2024. The track was extended in 1960 to form the present Long Course. There is also a "Short Course" of 880 yards (804.7 m), now used only by meetings organised by the Vintage Sports-Car Club.

== History ==
=== Bugatti Owners' Club ===
The track is owned by the Bugatti Owners' Club (BOC), founded in 1929, who were looking for a permanent home and bought the land in 1937. The club had previously run events at Lewes and on the Chalfont Heights Estate, Chalfont St Peter, Buckinghamshire. The club also ran a one-off event at Joel Park, Northwood Hill, Middlesex, on 22 June 1935, which was won by Richard Ormonde Shuttleworth, on a Bugatti, in a time of 30.16 sec. The BOC planned to develop Dancer's End, near Tring, Hertfordshire, but an event there scheduled for 20 June 1936 had to be cancelled. Motor Sport reported in December 1937:

"It will be recalled that about two years ago the Club planned to make Dancer's End a first-class hill-climb venue, and obtained approval from the landowner, Alan P. Good. Unfortunately, the noise nuisance, which is a disease not unknown to motor-race course promoters, broke out and the project was reluctantly abandoned,..."

=== 1930s ===
The first event at Prescott was staged in April 1938, on what is now the Short Course. As announced in Motor Sport: "The Opening Rally on April 10th will comprise an assembly at Cheltenham for lunch, followed by a run to Prescott and possibly timed runs up the hill, followed by tea at the Prescott club-house. Prescott will be ready for the first official meeting on Sunday, May 15th." Unofficial fastest time in April was set by I. Craig in a 4.9-litre supercharged Bugatti in a time of 55.58 seconds. Fastest time of the day at the inaugural meeting in May was set by Arthur Baron in a 2,270 c.c. supercharged Bugatti in a new record time of 50.70 seconds. Sydney Allard set the sports car record driving Hutchison's V12 Lincoln-engined Allard Special in a time of 54.35 seconds. On 3 July 1938 George Abecassis broke the Prescott outright record with a climb of 47.85 seconds in his supercharged 1½ litre Alta. Joe Fry bettered this unofficially when he climbed in 47.62 seconds in the 1,100 c.c. Freikaiserwagen, on 27 August 1938. Raymond Mays (2-litre E.R.A.) took the record on 30 July 1939 in a time of 46.14 seconds. Second overall at that meeting was Jean-Pierre Wimille in a 4.7-litre supercharged Bugatti, in the first international meeting held at Prescott.

There is a part of the course at Prescott named for Sydney Allard and known as Allard's Gap, sometimes shortened to Allard's. This resulted from an incident at the Bugatti Owners' Club meeting on 15 June 1947, when Sydney: "shot through the hedge at the semi-circle and landed well out in the field in the single-seater Allard.

=== Post War ===
Stirling Moss's first hillclimb was at Prescott on 9 May 1948, driving a Mk2 Cooper. He had hoped to enter at Shelsley Walsh somewhat earlier, but had been thwarted in this ambition as there were no spaces left in the entry list. On his actual debut at Prescott, Moss came fourth out of twelve, in the 500 c.c. class.

On 9 September 1951 at the Bugatti Owners' Club International Event Ken Wharton broke the track record in a time of 43.81 sec in a Cooper 1,000 c.c. Tony Marsh (Cooper) set a record at 43.32 sec in June 1956.

At the BOC meeting on 15 September 1963, Peter Westbury clinched the 1963 British Hill Climb Championship by taking second place to Peter Boshier-Jones (Lotus-Climax 1,220 c.c. supercharged) in the championship run-off. Westbury also took FTD in the class runs in a time of 48.95 secs in the Felday-Daimler.

In 1967 Motor reported: "Driving his V-8 engined Brabham, B. Eccles set up a new record for the hill of 47.31s. at the Bugatti Owners Club Invitation Prescott Hill climb on July 9."

=== Current Prescott ===
Prescott Hill has hosted at least one round of the British Hill Climb Championship since 1947, in the modern era of the sport, Prescott hosts the first round of the season with a second round towards the end of the season. A new "Test Day" edition to their calendar a few weeks before the season opener has made Prescott an ideal location to kick off the year.

The hill has 30 operation days per year and hosts a range of events from full competition days to driver schools and car club casual fun run days. The variety provided by Prescott allows for a wide range of cars and classes from the top of the British championships all the way down to pre second world war classics.

== Top Gear ==
An episode of Top Gear was filmed here, including a race between an Austin-Healey Sprite, which had most of its body panels removed, and a V6 Peugeot 306 with a number of cosmetic modifications and hydraulic suspension.

== See also ==
- Archie Butterworth
