= Harold Nockolds =

English journalist, historian and business person (1907–1982)

- Born: 1907
- Died: 1982 (aged 74–75)
- Occupation: journalist

Harold Nockolds (1907–1982) was an English journalist, historian and business person.

Harold Nockolds was the son of Walter Herbert Nockolds and Flora Mary van der Heyden. His brother was Roy Nockolds the artist noted for his depiction of racing cars and aeroplanes.

He started his journalist career at Motor Sport as Continental Correspondent before moving on in 1936 to become the Motor Racing Correspondent for The Times.

In 1938 G. T. Foulis & Co published his book The Magic of a Name, first definitive history of Rolls-Royce.

He served in the Second World War, receiving a commission into the Royal Army Service Corps (RASC) of the British Army on 15 February 1940. His service number was 119718. His service number was 119718. He later served in the North African campaign, for which he was mentioned in dispatches on 11 November 1943. He ended the war as an honorary major.
