= Denis Jenkinson =

English motorsports journalist (1920–1996)

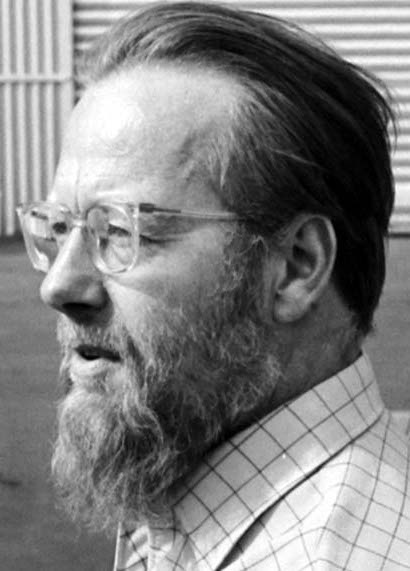
- Jenkinson in 1967
- Born: Denis Sargent Jenkinson; 11 December 1920
- Died: 29 November 1996 (aged 75)
- Occupations: Motor sport journalist and competitor Author
- Years active: 1946–1996
- Known for: Continental Correspondent for Motor Sport magazine, World Sidecar Champion 1949; 1955 Mille Miglia winner
- Notable work: With Moss in the Mille Miglia

Denis Sargent Jenkinson (11 December 1920 – 29 November 1996), "Jenks" or "DSJ" as he was known in the pages of Motor Sport, was a British journalist deeply involved in motorsports. As Continental Correspondent of the UK-based Motor Sport magazine, he covered Formula One and other races all over Europe. He gained fame as the navigator for Stirling Moss in their record-breaking triumph in the 1955 Mille Miglia cross-country race.

== Career ==
Jenkinson became a motor sport enthusiast in the mid-1930s:

"In 1936 I saw a racing car "in the flesh" or should I say "in the metal," for the first time, that was an E.R.A. at the schoolboys' Exhibition. Later in the year, whilst staying at Brighton, I found that the Lewes Speed Trials were quite near, so off I went to find the venue. It was there that I first saw racing-cars in action, what a thrill!"

Jenkinson was studying engineering at the Regent Street Polytechnic when the Second World War broke out. As a conscientious objector, he served in a civilian capacity at the Royal Aircraft Establishment in Farnborough. This brought him into contact with Bill Boddy, editor of Motor Sport, and other enthusiasts. In 1943 Motor Sport reported: "D.S. Jenkinson has constructed himself a very nice motor-bicycle of Norton parts, with taper forks, much of the work being accomplished by torch-light in a small shed."

After the war Jenkinson started competing on two and four wheels, but he lacked the funds to race regularly. He found that acting as sidecar passenger to top riders enabled him to both enjoy top-level European competition himself while being paid and to scratch a living writing about it – he was passenger to Eric Oliver (with whom he became World Champion in 1949) and Marcel Masuy. He competed as a sidecar passenger the following two seasons, latterly for BMW. He was 'given" a BMW R67 motorcycle for his personal use by the factory and with a sidecar attached used this to travel to report on racing throughout Europe. Jenkinson rarely wrote about his personal life but mentioned how he would pick up Mike Hawthorn, living nearby, who would ride it with Jenks as passenger.

Jenkinson abandoned front-line competition to become Continental Correspondent for Motor Sport. He spent his summers touring Europe and his winters in a succession of 'digs' in England; Jenks eventually settled near Crondall in Hampshire in a tiny run-down house with no mains electricity or water, largely full of his archives and of parts of vehicles he was 'fettling'. He was legendary in the sport for the lack of basic domestic amenities in his home; to Jenks nothing mattered but racing. He became accepted as the 'elder statesman' of British racing journalists due to his closeness to the teams and drivers, his conversational writing style and his obvious and enduring passion for the sport.

DSJ loved to race and drive Porsche cars and coined the term wischening (pronounced as wish, like in German wischen for wiping) for the manner in which one may corner successfully in a Porsche 356. He later adopted an E-Type Jaguar as his work transport, although at home he had assorted decrepit vehicles including an elderly Mercedes-Benz saloon, a Citroën 2CV and others.

His famous competitive outing was as navigator for Stirling Moss during the 1955 Mille Miglia; his article With Moss In The Mille Miglia is generally acknowledged as a classic of motor racing journalism. His book The Racing Driver was based on his experience as navigator.

The creation and use of "pacenotes" is associated with an earlier win of Mercedes-Benz at a long-distance road racing event, in Mexico on the new Pan-American Highway. Karl Kling/Hans Klenk prepared and won the 1952 Carrera Panamericana in a W194 despite having less power and more altitude induced power loss than the later roadgoing fuel-injected W198 Mercedes-Benz 300 SL and getting hit by a vulture that smashed the windscreen. Jenkinson's contribution to navigation and description thereof was leading to widespread use of pacenotes in rallying. Jenkinson and Moss, together in a Mercedes-Benz 300 SLR, went on to win the race by 32 minutes over the then two-time Formula One World Champion and 1953 Carrera winner Juan Manuel Fangio, who had engine problems, and only raced singlehandly since his a navigator had died in a crash years ago. This is one of the first examples of motoring journalists being an active part on what they are reporting. Jenkinson was one of the first ex competitors to go into reporting and journalism, a commonplace in today's coverage of Formula One with the likes of Jenson Button (2009 Formula One World Champion), Martin Brundle (former driver for McLaren Racing and Benetton Formula) and Nico Rosberg (2016 Formula One World Champion).

One of Jenks' most famous exploits was road-testing an unregistered, unsilenced and very much not road-legal Lotus Formula Two car on the roads near his Hampshire home on Christmas Day 1958, the logic being that the roads would be quiet and few police would be active.

As well as his journalism, Jenkinson went on to write several other motorsports books about Porsche, Frazer Nash, the Jaguar E-type, the 2.5-litre Formula One, Juan Manuel Fangio, the Schlumpf Collection and a particular Maserati. A compilation of some of his best pieces, and biographical articles about him, was published soon after his death as Jenks: A Passion For Motor Sport.

For many years in the 1950s he produced an annual Racing Car Review for Motor Sport, but stopped doing so as he became increasingly disgruntled with the discrepancies between the chassis numbers teams quoted and what was actually being raced; rather than compromise his journalistic integrity, Jenkinson simply stopped producing the books.

Jenkinson also developed the classification of a driver's effort into "tenths". 10/10ths being the highest, attained by only a few drivers in history; the ability to 'Tiger' (to race at ten-tenths and achieve feats that other drivers would find impossible) was seen as crucial for a champion.

In the sixties Jenkinson did much to promote the sport of drag racing in the pages of Motor Sport magazine. On 14 September 1963 he rode his NorBSA motorcycle, a BSA Gold Star 500 cc engine in a modified and lowered Norton frame, at the Brighton Speed Trials. He drove an Allard Dragon dragster and also rode a 648 cc Triumph sprint motorcycle in the 1965 Drag Festival. He remained a motorcycle enthusiast, and competed in hillclimbs and sprints on his own Tribsa hybrid well into his seventies. As DSJ he contributed regular columns and features for several decades to Motor Sport's sister magazine Motorcycle Sport run from the same offices at Standard House.

== Later life ==
In his later years, he became involved with Brooklands Museum and was involved in several adventurous operations, including exploring sealed up underground air raid shelters. Despite his advanced years, he worked as hard as any of the others involved and never asked for or received any special treatment.

Jenkinson suffered a series of strokes in 1996 and moved to a home administered by the motor industry benevolent fund (BEN). He died on 29 November 1996.

== Books ==
A partial list of the books written by Jenkinson follows. Not included are several monographs for the Profile series.

- The Racing Driver: The Theory and Practice of Fast Driving (1959)
- Grand Prix Cars (1959)
- A Story of Formula 1 1954–1960 (1960)
- The Racing Car Pocketbook (1962)
- The Maserati 250F (1975)
- The Batsford Guide to Racing Cars (1978)
- Porsche 356: Coupé, Cabriolet, Roadster, Speedster & Carrera (1980)
- Jaguar E Type: 3.8 & 4.2 6-cylinder, 5.3 V12 (1982)
- Porsche: Past and Present (1983)
- From Chain Drive to Turbocharger: The A.F.N. Story (1984)
- Maserati 3011: The story of a racing car (1987)
- Directory of Historic Racing Cars (1987)
- Motorcycle road racing: the 1950s in photographs (1989)
- Grand Prix Winners: Motor Racing Heroes since 1950 (1995)
- Jenks: A Passion For Motorsport (1997)
- A Passion for Porsches (2001)

== Footnotes ==
Sporting positions
Preceded by None	World Sidecar Champion (with Eric Oliver); 1949	Succeeded by Eric Oliver; Lorenzo Dobelli
