= British Drag Racing Association =

The British Drag Racing Association (BDRA) was formed in June 1964 by Sydney Allard, a Ford motor dealer, hillclimbing, rally and circuit racing car driver. It later became the British Drag Racing Association & Hot Rod Association but reverted to BDRA in 1982.

It opened the first permanent drag racing strip in the UK at Santa Pod, near Bedford in 1966.
