= Sydney Allard =

British founder of the Allard car company & rally driver (1910–1966)

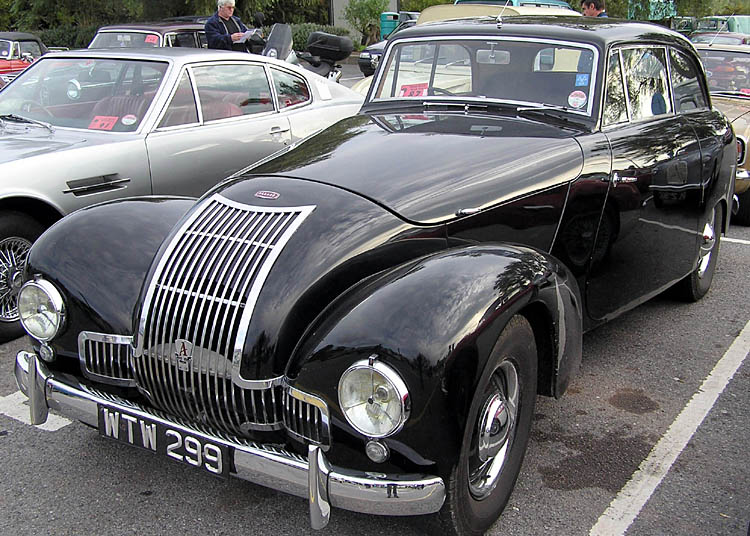
1948 Allard P1 Sports

Sydney Herbert Allard (19 June 1910 – 12 April 1966) was a British businessman and rally and hillclimb driver. He was the founder of the Allard car company and competed in cars of his own manufacture.

== Trials, hillclimbs, rallies, and road racing ==
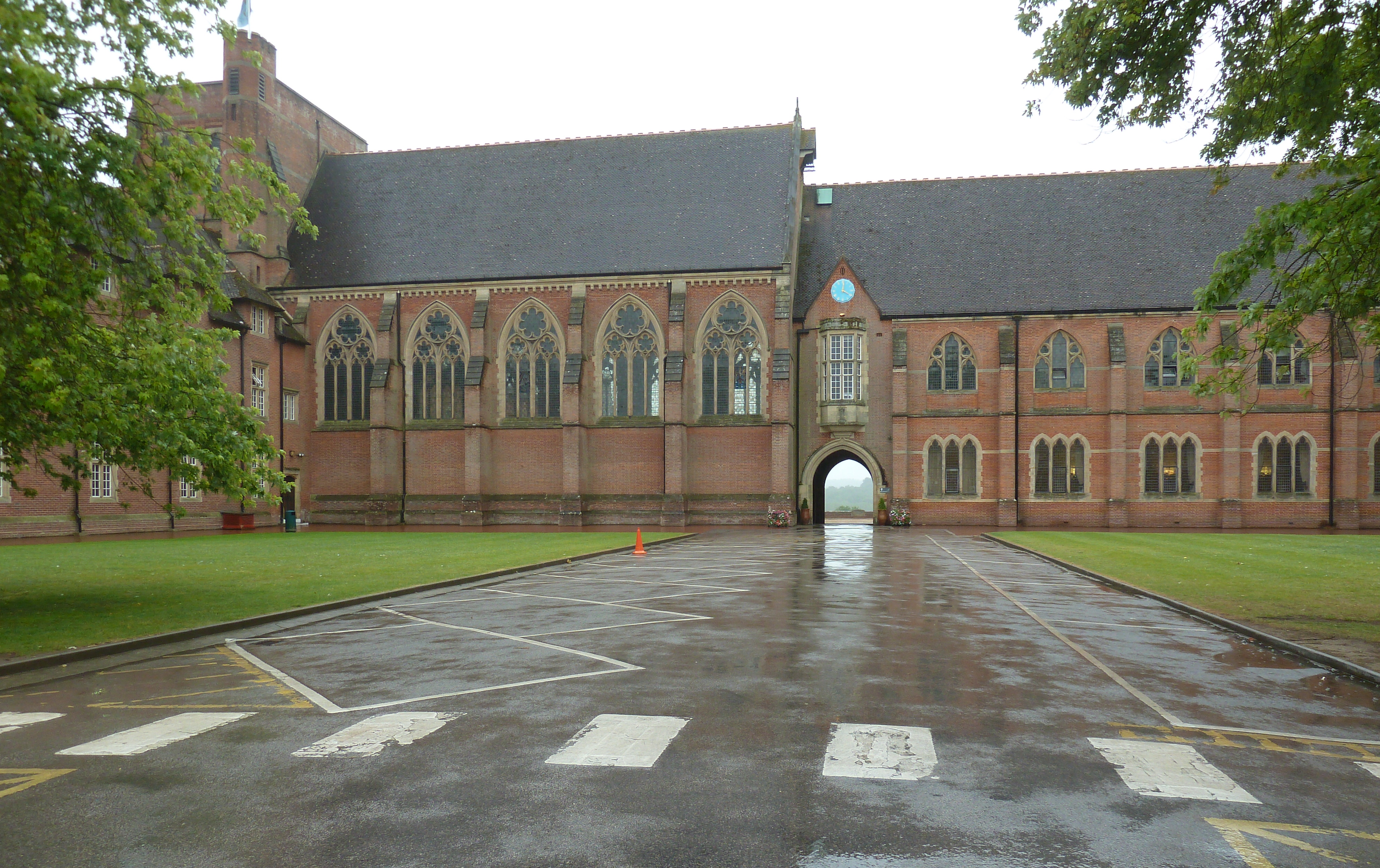
Ardingly College

Born in London, England, Sydney grew up a member of a family owning a substantial Ford dealership, Adlard Motor, in Acre Lane Clapham. (Note: Adlard Motor Group Holdings Limited, Company number 00247141 inc. 1930 (not Allard) Motor Sport May 1938) Educated at Ardingly College in Sussex he became a staunch member of the Streatham & District Motor Cycle Club followed by his brothers Leslie and Dennis and their sister Mary. He was appointed a director of Adlard's on leaving school. He married Eleanor May in 1936. Their son, Alan, drove Allard's first British-designed dragster with such success Sydney was made first president of the British Drag Racing Association.

In 1929, Allard began racing with a Morgan three-wheeler which he ran at Brooklands and elsewhere. On 31 August 1929 the new Cyclecar Club held a meeting at Brooklands where: "the first race was won by Sidney (sic) Allard's Morgan, at 73.37 m.p.h. from a couple of Austins." By 1933 he was competing in trials, retiring from the London-Exeter Trial that year in his Allard special, the Morgan converted by Allard to four wheels. He also retired in the London to Land's End trial.

In 1935 he won his class, for unlimited unsupercharged sports cars, at the Brighton Speed Trials in a Ford V-8. In April 1936 he won a 50-mile handicap race on the sand at Southport in his Allard V8. The Allard Special was put into limited production with Ford V8 and Lincoln V12 motors. A Ford-based special was supplied to a Mr. Gilson in 1937, while a four-seater was offered the following year. In 1937 Allard attempted to climb Ben Nevis, a mountain in Scotland, in his Allard car. The car crashed and rolled but Allard emerged with only bruising. Sydney Allard set the sports car record at the inaugural Prescott Hill Climb on 15 May 1938, driving Hutchison's V12 Lincoln-engined Allard Special in a time of 54.35 seconds. That year Allard, with Ken Hutchison and Guy Warburton in the "Tailwaggers" Allard-Special team, competed successfully in trials, sprints, rallies and races. On 15 July 1939, Allard took a class win at the Lewes Speed Trials in a time of 22.12 secs. Allard won the last speed event to be held in England prior to World War Two. Having set the fastest time at the Horndean Speed Trials, his car overturned past the finish line. Both he and his passenger, Bill Boddy, were thrown clear and uninjured.

During the Second World War Sydney Allard operated under the Ministry of Supply for the Army Auxiliary Adlards Motors' large repair shop in Fulham fixing army vehicles, including Ford trucks and Jeeps. During the bombing in 1941: "Sydney and his family had a very narrow escape recently during a raid." In 1943 he had 225 employees and was renovating more than 30 vehicles a week.

At the end of the war Allard soon returned to competition, taking part in the Filton Speed Trials on 28 October 1945. He restarted his car company, coping with petrol rationing, material shortages and export quotas. A 1947 Allard-dealer advertisement stated: "Vacancies still exist on the 1947 quota-list for early delivery of Open Two-Seater and Tourer models."

Allard won the 1949 British Hill Climb Championship at the wheel of the self-built Steyr-Allard, fitted with a war surplus air-cooled V8 engine. He was third in the Championship in 1947 and 1948, winning in 1949, second in 1950, and third again in 1951, when the Steyr-Allard was converted to four-wheel-drive.

In 1949 Allard cars won the team prize in the Monte Carlo Rally (L. Potter 4th overall, A.A.C. Godsall 8th, A.G. Imhof 11th) with Sydney Allard finishing in 24th place. In 1950 Allard finished eighth in the Monte Carlo Rally, then raced in the Targa Florio in Sicily where his Allard car crashed and burned. He bounced back with a third place at the 24 Hours of Le Mans that year, partnered with Tom Cole Jr. A gearbox failure left Allard and Cole driving for hours with top gear only. "Allard's determination and fearless driving captured the imagination of the huge crowd. The high-pitched whine of his engine earned him the nickname of 'The hissing madman.'"

An advertisement from 1950 for the Allard J2 stated: "Some overseas purchasers have preferred to fit the more powerful engines suitable for this chassis such as American Ford, Mercury, Cadillac, Ardun, Grancor etc." Sydney Allard raced an Allard J2 Chrysler in the Tourist Trophy at Dundrod Circuit in 1951. Allards were exported to the United States as rolling chassis to be fitted with a motor on arrival. In the austerity period after the Second World War Allard struggled to source the raw materials for car construction, where the emphasis was on 'export or die.' It made no sense to import American engines and gearboxes only to turn round and export them again to the United States. Allard preparations for Le Mans in 1951 were delayed as Cadillac engines were in short supply, due to GM concentrating on production for the Korean War.

Sydney Allard achieved international recognition by winning the 1952 Monte Carlo Rally in an Allard P1, with co-driver Guy Warburton and navigator Tom Lush. Starting from Glasgow he narrowly defeated Stirling Moss, in a Sunbeam-Talbot 90, who finished second overall while competing in his first rally. The P1 was powered by a 4,375 c.c. Ford V8 side-valve motor. Mrs. Eleanor Allard, Sydney's wife, also competed in this event, accompanied by her sisters Edna and Hilda, but retired.

Allard competed in the 24 Hours of Le Mans in 1951, 1952 and 1953 but did not finish. In 1951 he shared a works J2 with the American driver Tom Cole and retired with gearbox failure. In 1952 he and Jack Fairman drove the works J2X, chassis number 3055, fitted with a Chrysler hemi engine, where the car retired at 6.30 a.m. having thrown a rod. In 1953 he shared a Cadillac-engined Allard J2R with Philip Fotheringham-Parker, leading the race at the end of the first lap, but on lap four he was the first to retire with collapsed rear suspension and a severed brake pipe. In 1952 and 1953 a sister car was driven at Le Mans by Zora Arkus-Duntov, a one-time Allard employee. Carroll Shelby also raced an Allard-Cadillac J2 in the United States early in his driving career. Thus the successful Allard formula of an American V8 engine in a light chassis inspired the development of the Chevrolet Corvette and the A.C. Shelby Cobra.

An article on page 140 of the book Eagle Special Investigator by Macdonald Hastings, features Sydney Allard in "Special Investigator Drives a Racing Car", published by Michael Joseph in 1953.

In 1958 Allard built a Steyr-engined sports car for sprints and hillclimbs, the motor purchased from Dennis Poore: "This Allard Special can certainly step off. It covered the top section of the Brighton kilometre at 125 m.p.h. and won its class at Shelsley Walsh and Prescott, and two classes at Stapleford." He finished third in the unlimited sports car class at the Brighton Speed Trials that year, covering the standing kilometre in 25.99 sec. "Allard's air-cooled Steyr-Allard with Lotus front wheels and very compact body was third - although a sports car, it was started by means of an external battery." The car appeared at the Prescott Hill Climb on 13 September 1959, but is believed to have been broken up.

Allard then turned his attention to a twin-engined Steyr four-wheel-drive prototype, of great complexity. "All this leads to 9 litres of motor car and a very brave Sydney Allard surrounded by chains, shafts and engines." The car featured a solidly-mounted rear axle to which he planned to mount American-type dragster slick tyres. This was an early indication of the influence of American drag racing on his designs. The car was never successfully run and soon abandoned.

== The 1960s: rallying, drag racing ==
In the sixties Sydney Allard continued to compete in rallies mostly accompanied by Australian navigator Tom Fisk. They won their class in the 1963 Monte Carlo Rally in a Ford Allardette. Starting from Glasgow they reached Monte Carlo unpenalised. In the 1964 Monte Allard hit a level-crossing in Czechoslovakia in his Ford Cortina and retired. Allard's final outing in the Monte Carlo Rally came in 1965.

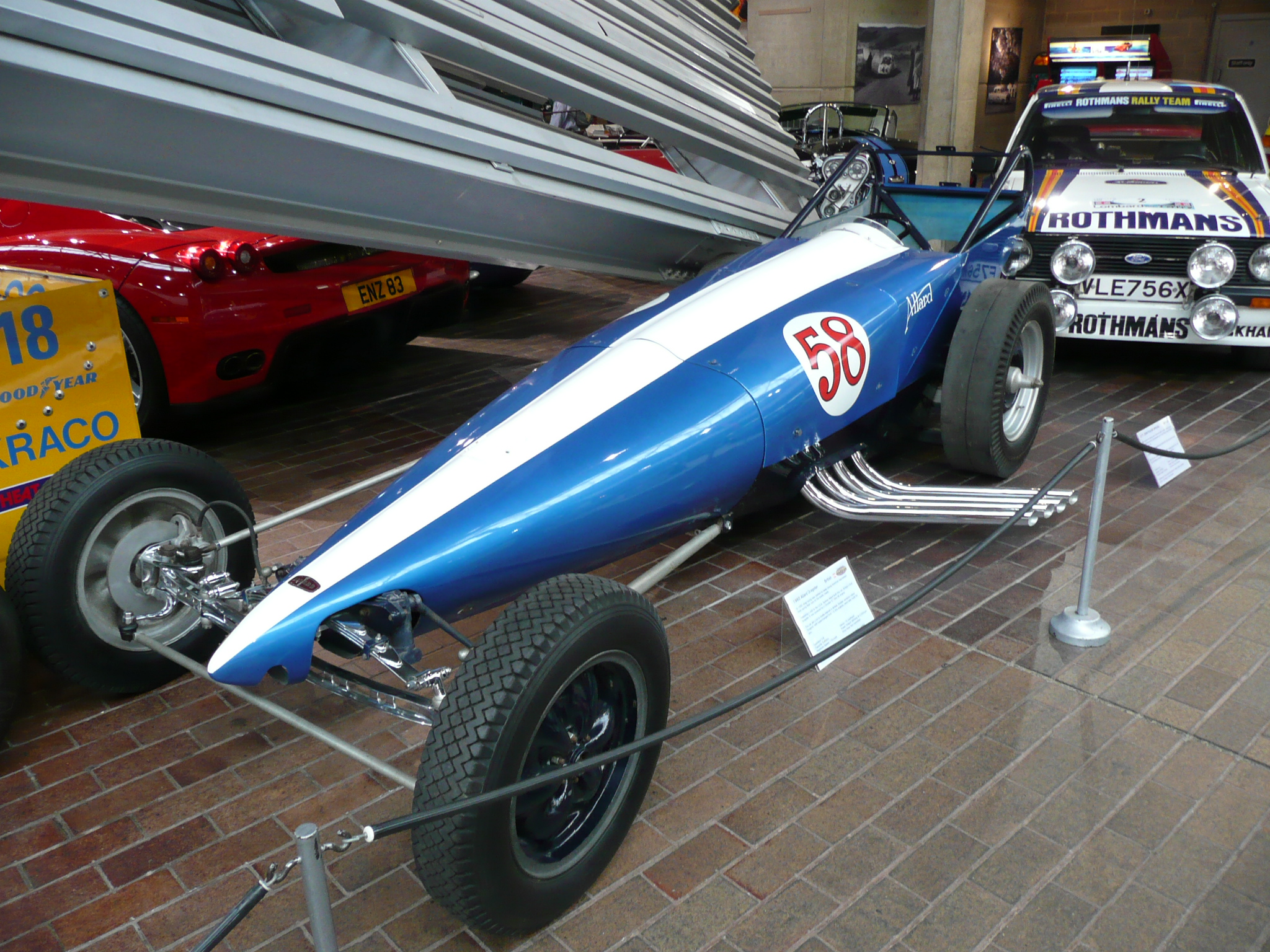
Allard slingshot dragster

In 1961 Sydney Allard, considered by many to be the father of British drag racing, built the Allard dragster, a supercharged Chrysler-powered slingshot. Constructed in 23 weeks between January and June 1961 at Adlards Garage, Clapham, in London, the car featured a 354-cubic inch Chrysler motor with front-mounted 6-71 GMC blower. Some speed equipment for the car was imported from Dean Moon in California.

The dragster was first shown at Brands Hatch in July 1961 and then demonstrated on 24 July on the straight of the club circuit at Silverstone, sans bodywork. The gearbox failed on this occasion. The first competitive appearance was at the Brighton Speed Trials on 2 September 1961. There was talk of a new track record over the kilometre from the Allard dragster with excitement reaching fever pitch. This only led to a huge disappointment when the fuel line ruptured on the line, completing the course on four cylinders in a time of 37.91 secs. The car continued to misfire on the second attempt. This was a blow from which the reputation of the car never fully recovered. Bill Boddy, editor of Motor Sport, called it a fiasco, saying the mechanical problems had also occurred in testing at Boreham. The Autocar described the Allard dragster as a "gallant failure."

The car was then invited to appear over the standing start quarter mile at an N.S.A. record meeting at Wellesbourne Aerodrome, near Stratford-Upon-Avon, on 14 October 1961. Denis Jenkinson writing in Motor Sport said:

"Sydney Allard pointed the sleek blue dragster down the quarter-mile, let in the clutch, opened up and with a sound like a large bomber going down the runway disappeared through the timing traps. Time : 10.841 sec., which made the motorcycle riders whistle a bit.

There were no arguments about the dragster's performance this time and "sack-cloth and ashes" were handed out to all dis-believers and certain Editors! [Congratulations, Sydney Allard- but a kilometre is a long quarter-mile and I still maintain that the dragster didn't live up to Allard high pressure pre-Brighton publicity.-ED.]"

Sadly few spectators witnessed this achievement. According to Jenkinson: "Allard's temperamental machine eventually did 10.48 sec on its best run," for the standing-start quarter mile, which took place at Debden, Essex on 14 April 1962. This was the fastest quarter-mile time ever recorded in the U.K.

The car was demonstrated at the Festival of Motoring at Goodwood on 14 July 1962. At Brighton on 15 September 1962 the Allard dragster clocked two runs at 22.30 and 22.04 seconds. A respectable performance but no outright win or record. Motor Sport reported: "It appears that before the end of the Brighton kilometre the Allard dragster had burst the pipe between supercharger and engine, a common problem with such an installation and the reason why the Americans bolt their blowers on the engine, eliminating a long induction pipe." Allard then went to Church Fenton "setting up the fastest s.s. kilometre achieved by a four-wheeled vehicle in this country" - 20.86 secs. "Allard also did a s.s. ¼-mile in 11.54 sec, and he crossed the line at 147.77 m.p.h. at the end of the longer distance, which rather disposes of previous claims in the 170-190 m.p.h. bracket."

In 1963 the Allard put two rods through the block on Madeira Drive in Brighton. The car turned out to be a fifties-style dragster at a time when dragster design was rapidly evolving. Tire technology, with wider purpose-built drag slicks, was pushing speeds ever higher in the U.S. By the time Mickey Thompson showed up at Brighton in 1963 with his Ford-powered Harvey Aluminum Special the Allard dragster was looking distinctly dated. But this charismatic car was the true pioneer of British drag racing and a game-changer as UK racers adopted American methods and style. Allard was instrumental in bringing Dante Duce and Mickey Thompson to England in 1963 to demonstrate their dragsters. Duce appeared at Silverstone on 10 September (press demonstration); with Thompson joining in at the Brighton Speed Trials on 14 September; Church Lawford, near Rugby, on 21 September and Debden, Essex, 22 September 1963. Sydney Allard was awarded the SEMA trophy for his performances at the races.

In January 1964 Sydney Allard launched the Dragstar Dragon, a low-cost dragster designed by John Hume, powered by a Shorrock-supercharged 1,500 c.c. Ford engine, costing under £500 in kit form. Several cars of this type were produced. Among the drivers were his son Alan Allard, Gerry Belton and Denis Jenkinson. Alan Allard and Belton demonstrated their dragsters at the 1964 Italian Grand Prix at Monza on 6 September.

Allard founded the British Drag Racing Association, launched in June 1964, and served as its President. He followed this with the International Drag Festivals held in England in 1964 and 1965, featuring US dragsters and drivers. In 1964 Don Garlits, Tommy Ivo, Tony Nancy and Dante Duce participated in the First International Drag Festival, a six-event series that did much to promote the sport of drag racing in the UK. The 1964 Drag Festival was held at the following venues: Blackbushe Airport, nr Camberley, Surrey, (twice: Sat 19 Sep, Sun 4 Oct), which was still an operational airport; RAF Chelveston, Northants, (Sun 20 September); RAF Woodvale, nr Southport, Lancashire (Sat 26 September); RAF Church Fenton, nr Tadcaster, Yorkshire, (Sun 27 September); RAF Kemble, nr Cirencester, Gloucestershire, (Sat 3 October).

The Second International Drag Festival was held at Blackbushe Airport, Sat/Sun 25/26 September 1965, and RAF Woodvale, Sun 3 October 1965. The Blackbushe event was affected by torrential rain: "Unfortunately, the Blackbushe weekend was a financial catastrophe, and though Woodvale reduced the losses considerably, it was not enough to save Drag Festivals Ltd., who were forced to go into liquidation." A second Allard-Chrysler dragster "was constructed for the 1965 Drag Festival. At the Woodvale event Alan Allard covered the standing ¼ mile in 9.30 secs-160 m.p.h. but in the qualifying run the Allard-Chrysler had reached 168 m.p.h."

Sydney Allard died at his home Blackhills, Esher, Surrey on 12 April 1966. "He had been ill for several months. The cause of death was not disclosed."

== Legacy ==
The Hissing Madman. That there was keen interest in drag racing was beyond doubt as hundreds turned up at Blackbushe Airport on 25 September 1966, to see a non-existent race.
In 1991 Sydney Allard was posthumously inducted into the International Drag Racing Hall of Fame.
In 2007 Sydney Allard was posthumously inducted into the British Drag Racing Hall of Fame.
There is a part of the course at Prescott Hill Climb known as Allard's Gap, sometimes shortened to Allard's. This resulted from an incident at the Bugatti Owners' Club meeting on 15 June 1947, when Sydney: "shot through the hedge at the semi-circle and landed well out in the field in the single-seater Allard."
There is an Allard bend on the Craigantlet hill climb course, near Belfast.
There is a corner named Allard just after the start at Thruxton Circuit in Hampshire.

== Bibliography ==
- John Bolster, Specials, Pages 33–34, 39-40, G.T. Foulis & Co Ltd, Reprinted 1971.
- Cole, Lance (2017). "Chapter 6: Sydney Allard's Towering Achievements". The Classic Car Adventure: Driving Through History on the Road to Nostalgia. Barnsley, England: Pen & Sword. ISBN 9781473896413.
- Tom Lush, foreword by Bill Boddy, Allard, the inside story, Motor Racing Publications (Croydon), pub 1977, 207 pages, ISBN 0-900549-30-0
- Brian Taylor, foreword by Don Garlits, Crazy horses: the history of British drag racing, Haynes Pub., 2009, ISBN 978-1-84425-425-5

== See also ==
- Archie Butterworth

Sporting positions
Preceded by Raymond Mays	British Hill Climb Champion; 1949	Succeeded by Dennis Poore
