= Bugatti Type 13 =

One of the first cars by Bugatti

The Bugatti Type 13 was the first car produced solely with the "Bugatti" name plate. Production of the Type 13, and later Types 15, 17, 22, and 23, began with the company's founding in 1910 and lasted through 1920, with 435 examples produced. Most road cars used an eight-valve engine, though five Type 13 racers had 16-valve heads, some of the first ever produced. The road cars became known as pur-sang ("thoroughbred") in keeping with Ettore Bugatti's feelings for his designs.

The car was brought back after World War I with a multivalve engine to bring fame to the marque at Brescia. The production Brescia tourer also brought in much-needed cash.

== Type 10 ==
Bugatti Type 10
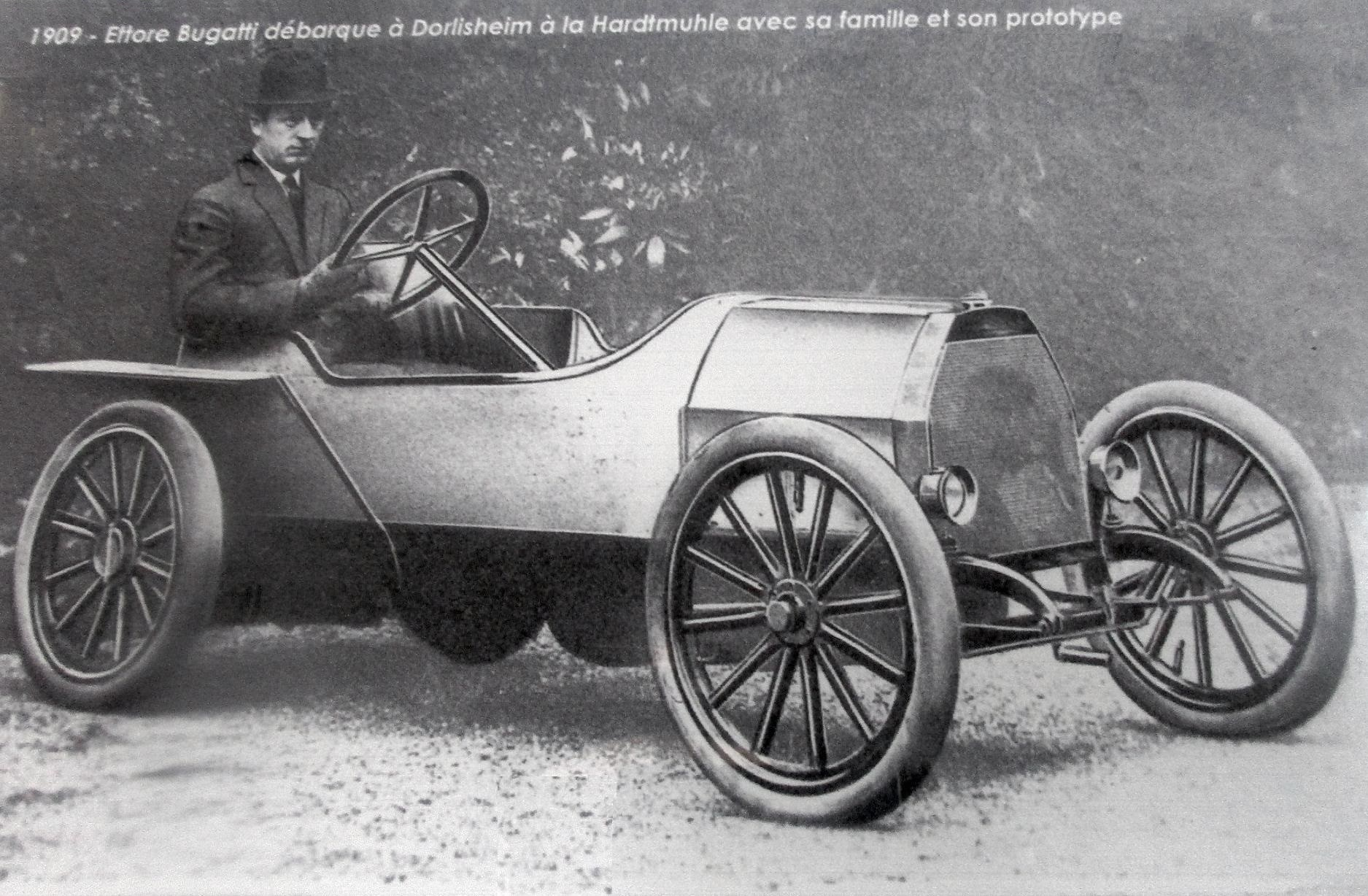

Overview
- Manufacturer: Automobiles Ettore Bugatti
- Also called: Bugatti Type 10 Pur Sang
- Production: 1907–1909; 1 produced
- Assembly: Germany: Molsheim, Alsace
- Designer: Ettore Bugatti

Body and chassis
- Body style: Open Wheeler
- Layout: Front Engine, RWD
- Platform: Bugatti Type 9C-A
- Related: Bugatti Type 9

Powertrain
- Engine: 1,131 cc (1.1 L) Deutz-Bugatti derived I4
- Power output: 10 PS (7.4 kW); 17 N⋅m (12.5 lb⋅ft)
- Transmission: 4-Speed Manual

Dimensions
- Curb weight: 365 kilograms (805 lb)

Chronology
- Predecessor: Bugatti Type 9C-A

The Bugatti automobile was prototyped as the Type 10 in Ettore Bugatti's basement in 1908 and 1909 while he was chief engineer at Deutz Gasmotoren Fabrik in Cologne, Germany, as a modified version of the Bugatti Type 9C-A, but significantly destroked.

The Type 10 used a monobloc straight-four engine of Ettore's own design. It was an overhead-cam unit with two valves per cylinder, which was highly advanced for the time. A very-undersquare design, it had a 60 mm bore and 100 mm stroke for a total of 1.1 L (1131 cc/69 in^{3}). This was attached to an open roadster body with solid axles front and rear. Leaf springs suspended the front with no suspension at all in the rear. Cables operated rear drum brakes.

On ending his contract with Deutz, Ettore loaded his family into the Type 10 and headed to the Alsace region, then still part of the German Empire, looking for a factory to begin producing cars of his own. After World War I, Alsace became a part of France again, and with it Bugatti.

The car was preserved and nicknamed "la baignoire" ("the bathtub") by the staff at Molsheim in later years due to its shape. Ettore restored it in 1939 and repainted it an orange-red color, earning it a new nickname, "le homard" ("the lobster"). It was moved to Bordeaux for the duration of World War II and remained there for decades before falling into private ownership. Today, the car is in California in the hands of a private collector.

== Type 13 ==
Bugatti Type 13 Bugatti Type 13 Brescia
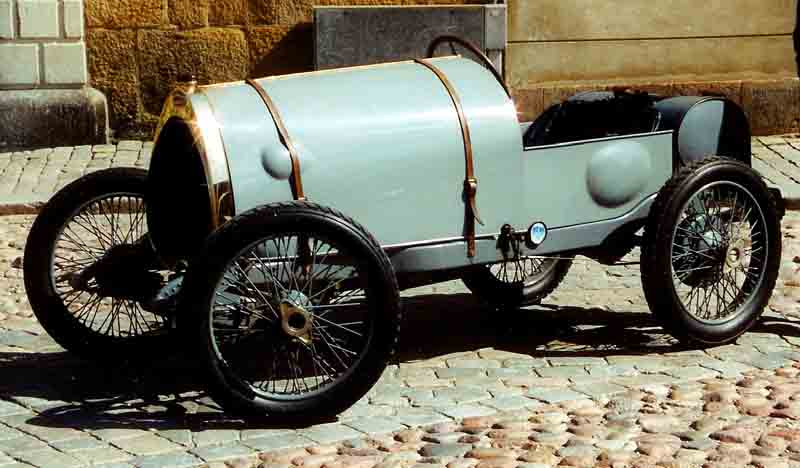

Overview
- Manufacturer: Automobiles Ettore Bugatti
- Production: 1910–1911; 1920–1926; 2,000 produced
- Model years: 1911; 1921–1926
- Assembly: France: Molsheim, Alsace
- Designer: Ettore Bugatti

Body and chassis
- Body style: Roadster
- Layout: Front Engine, RWD

Powertrain
- Engine: 1,368–1,453 cc (1.4–1.5 L) I4
- Power output: 16–30 PS (12–22 kW) @ 3,500-4,000 rpm 16–45 N⋅m (12–33 lb⋅ft) @ 2,000-3,000 rpm
- Transmission: 4-speed manual

Dimensions
- Wheelbase: 2,590 millimetres (102 in)
- Length: 3,100 millimetres (120 in)
- Width: 1,100 millimetres (43 in)
- Height: 1,200 millimetres (47 in)
- Curb weight: 550 kg (1,213 lb)

Upon starting operations at his new factory in Molsheim, Bugatti refined his light shaft-driven car into the Type 13 racer. This included boring the engine out to 65 mm (2.56 in) for a total of 1.4 L (1,368 cc; 83.48 cu in). A major advance was the four-valve head Bugatti designed — one of the first of its type ever conceived. Power output with dual Zenith carburetters reached 30 hp (22 kW) at 4500 rpm, more than adequate for the 660-lb (300-kg) car. Leaf springs were now fitted all around, and the car rode on a roughly 2-m (80-in) wheelbase. Although having the appearance of a toy, the Bugatti Type 13 was successfully raced. It was seen at hill climbs as early as 1910 looking rather out of place compared to the bulky and brutish competition. What the Type 13 lacked in power, it made up in handling, steering, and braking. These important elements were retained throughout all future Bugatti designs. Top speed was at 125 km/h.

The new company produced five examples in 1910, and entered the French Grand Prix at Le Mans in 1911. The tiny Bugatti looked out of place at the race, but calmly took second place after seven hours of racing.

World War I caused production to halt in the disputed region. Ettore took two completed Type 13 cars with him to Milan for the duration of the war, leaving the parts for three more buried near the factory. After the war, Bugatti returned, unearthed the parts, and prepared five Type 13s for racing.

Post World War I, A Grand Prix for Voiturettes at Le Mans was the only French event of 1920, and Bugatti entered the two completed cars from Milan and one more from the remaining parts. Ettore's illegal act of placing a hand on the radiator cap during the race brought disqualification to the leading car, however.

The Type 13 was unbeatable. Bugatti's cars finished in the top four places at the Brescia Grand Prix in 1921, and orders poured in. Capitalizing on this victory, all subsequent four-valve Bugatti models bore the Brescia moniker.

These were the only Bugatti models to locate the carburetor on the left side of the engine and the exhaust on the right. In 1921, the bore was increased to 68 mm (2.68 in), which gave an overall displacement of 1.5 L (1,453 cc; 88.67 cu in). Front-wheel brakes were added in 1926.

== Type 15 ==
Bugatti Type 15
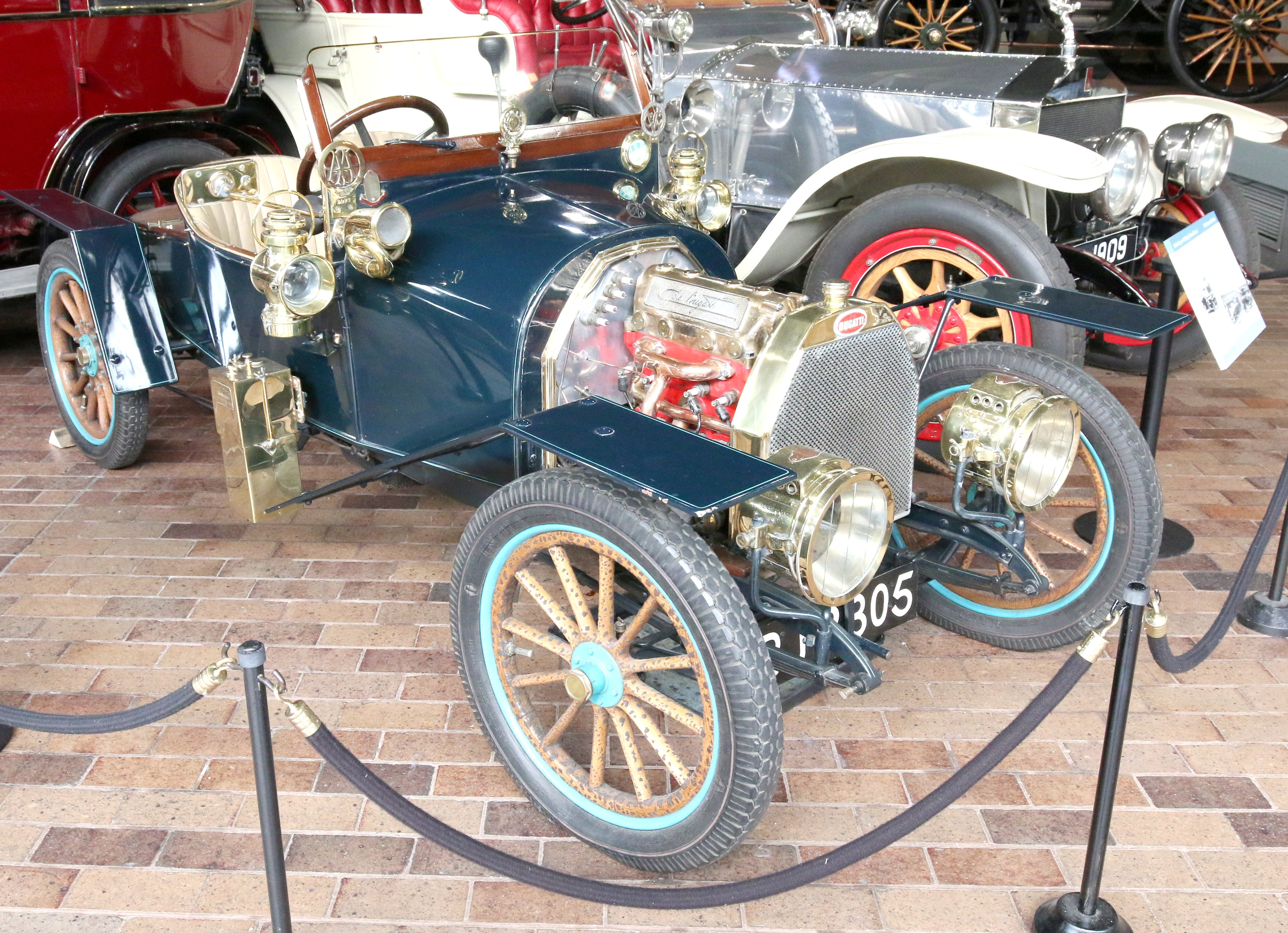

Overview
- Manufacturer: Automobiles Ettore Bugatti
- Production: 1910–1913; 483 produced
- Assembly: Germany: Molsheim, Alsace
- Designer: Ettore Bugatti

Body and chassis
- Body style: Roadster
- Layout: Front Engine, RWD

Powertrain
- Engine: 1,368 cc (1.4 L) I4
- Power output: 18 PS (13 kW) @ 3,000 rpm 18 N⋅m (13.3 lb⋅ft) @ 2,100 rpm
- Transmission: 4-speed Manual

Dimensions
- Wheelbase: 2,400 millimetres (94 in)
- Length: 3,800 millimetres (150 in)
- Width: 1,350 millimetres (53 in)
- Height: 1,220 millimetres (48 in)
- Curb weight: 650 kg (1,433 lb)

The Type 15 was a version of the Type 13 with a longer, 2400-mm (94.5-in), wheelbase. It had a six-sided radiator in front and semielliptical rear leaf springs. A variety of dates of production have been suggested, but none before 1910 and none later than 1914.

== Type 17 ==
Bugatti Type 17
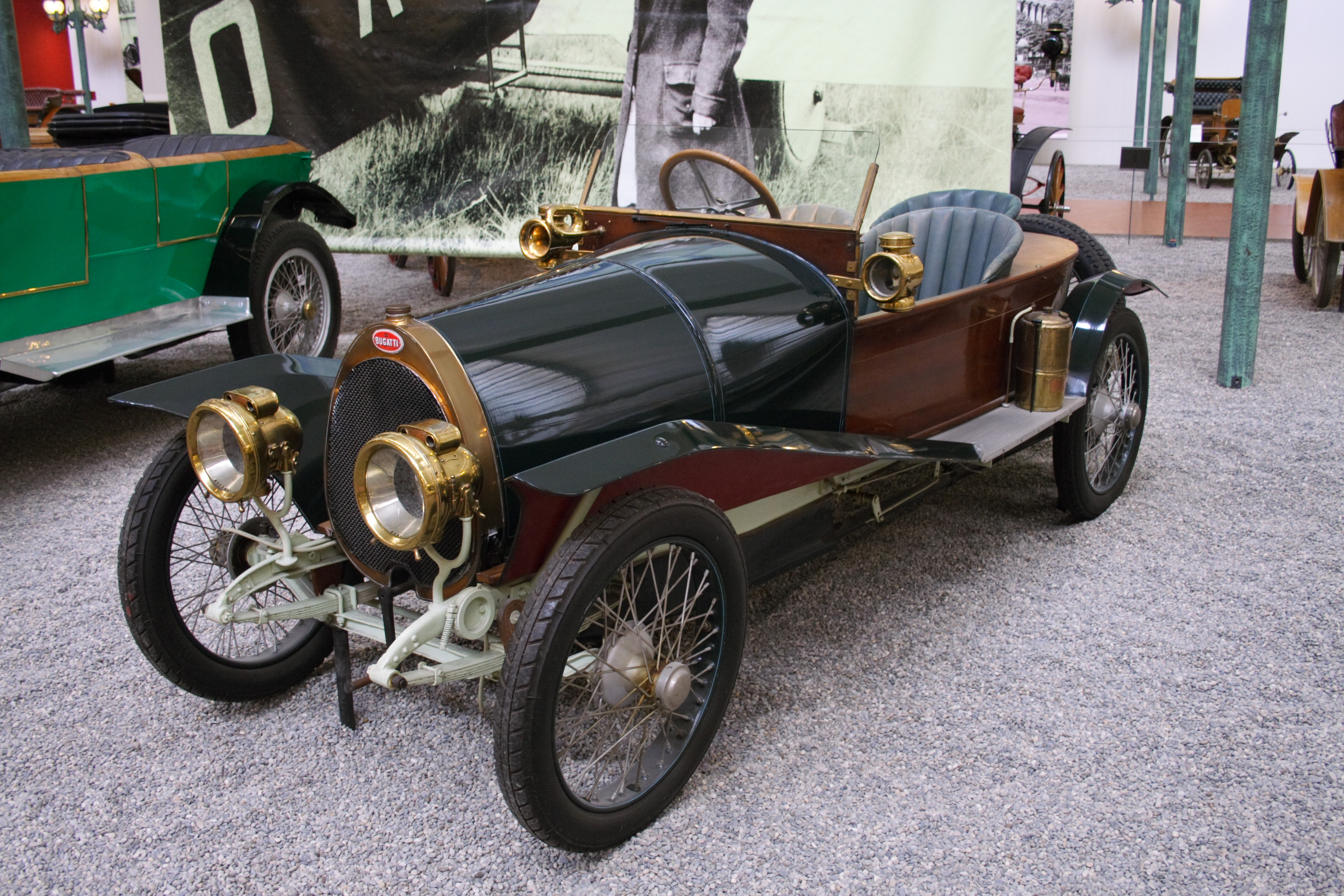

Overview
- Manufacturer: Automobiles Ettore Bugatti
- Production: 1910–1919; 435 produced
- Assembly: Molsheim, France
- Designer: Ettore Bugatti

Body and chassis
- Body style: Roadster
- Layout: Front Engine, RWD

Powertrain
- Engine: 1,327 cc (1.3 L) I4; 1,368 cc (1.4 L) I4
- Power output: 18–20 PS (13–15 kW) @ 3,000 rpm 18 N⋅m (13.3 lb⋅ft) @ 2,100 rpm
- Transmission: 4-speed Manual

Dimensions
- Wheelbase: 2,550 mm (100.4 in)
- Length: 3,250 millimetres (128 in)
- Width: 1,580 millimetres (62 in)
- Height: 1,200 millimetres (47 in)
- Curb weight: 750 kg (1,653 lb)

Another Type 13-based version, the Type 17, was also produced alongside the 15. This used a longer yet, 2,550 mm (100.4 in) wheelbase. It shared its hexagonal radiator and rear springs with the Type 15. As with the 13 and 15, the engine was bored out by 1 mm (0.04 in) in 1912, increasing displacement from 1,327 to 1,368 cc (1.3 to 1.4 L) along with two additional horsepower.

== Type 22 ==
Bugatti Type 22
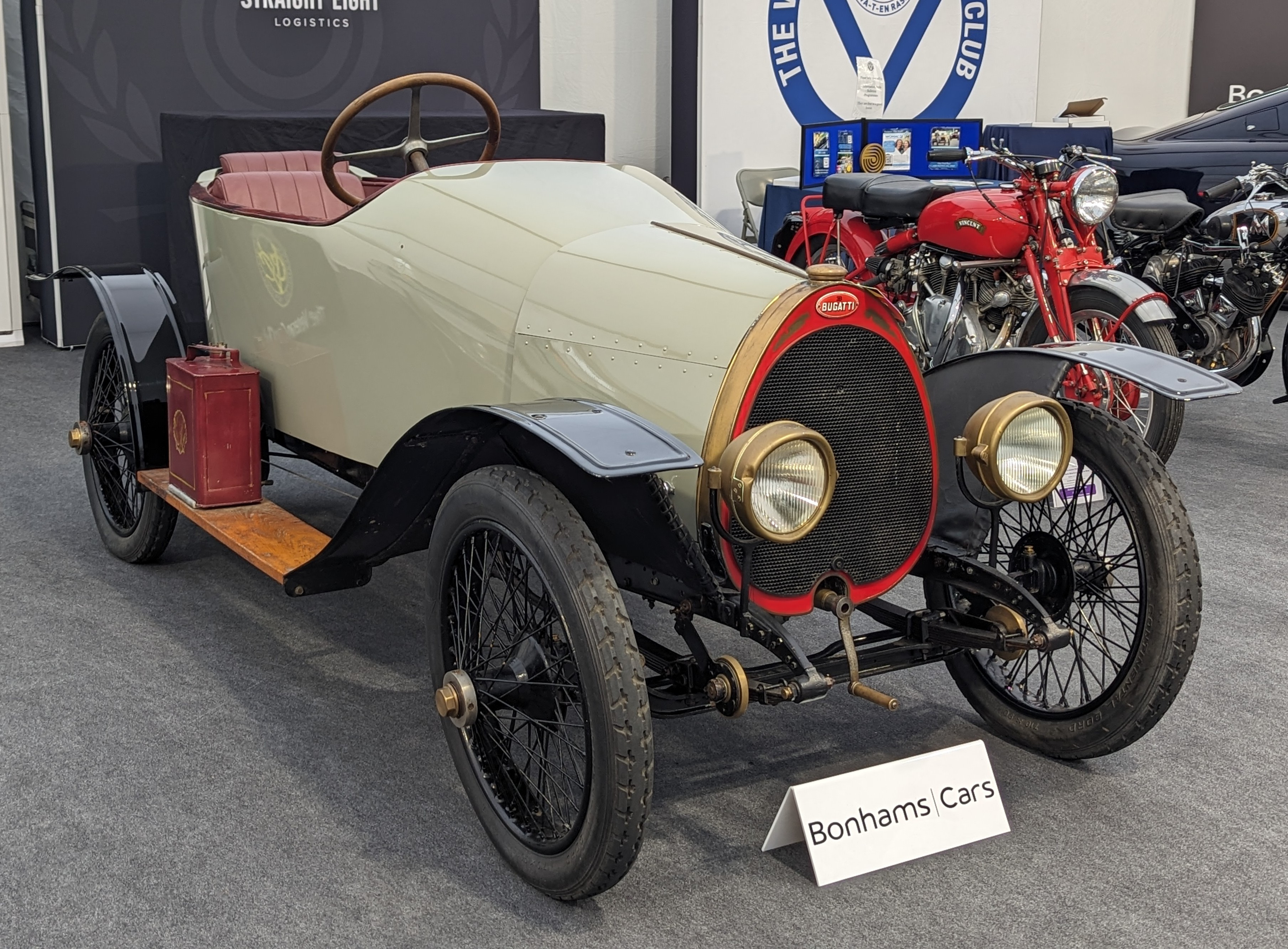

Overview
- Manufacturer: Automobiles Ettore Bugatti
- Production: 1915-1920; 30 produced
- Assembly: Molsheim, France
- Designer: Ettore Bugatti

Body and chassis
- Body style: Roadster
- Layout: Front Engine, RWD

Powertrain
- Engine: 1,399 cc (1.4 L) I4
- Power output: 18 PS (13 kW) @ 3,000 rpm 18 N⋅m (13.3 lb⋅ft) @ 2,100 rpm
- Transmission: 4-speed Manual

Dimensions
- Wheelbase: 2,550 mm (100 in)
- Length: 4,850 millimetres (191 in)
- Width: 1,500 millimetres (59 in)
- Height: 1,200 millimetres (47 in)
- Curb weight: 675 kg (1,489 lb)

The Type 15 was updated in 1913 as the Type 22. It had a larger roadgoing body, an oval radiator, and quarter-circle springs.

== Type 23 ==
Bugatti Type 23
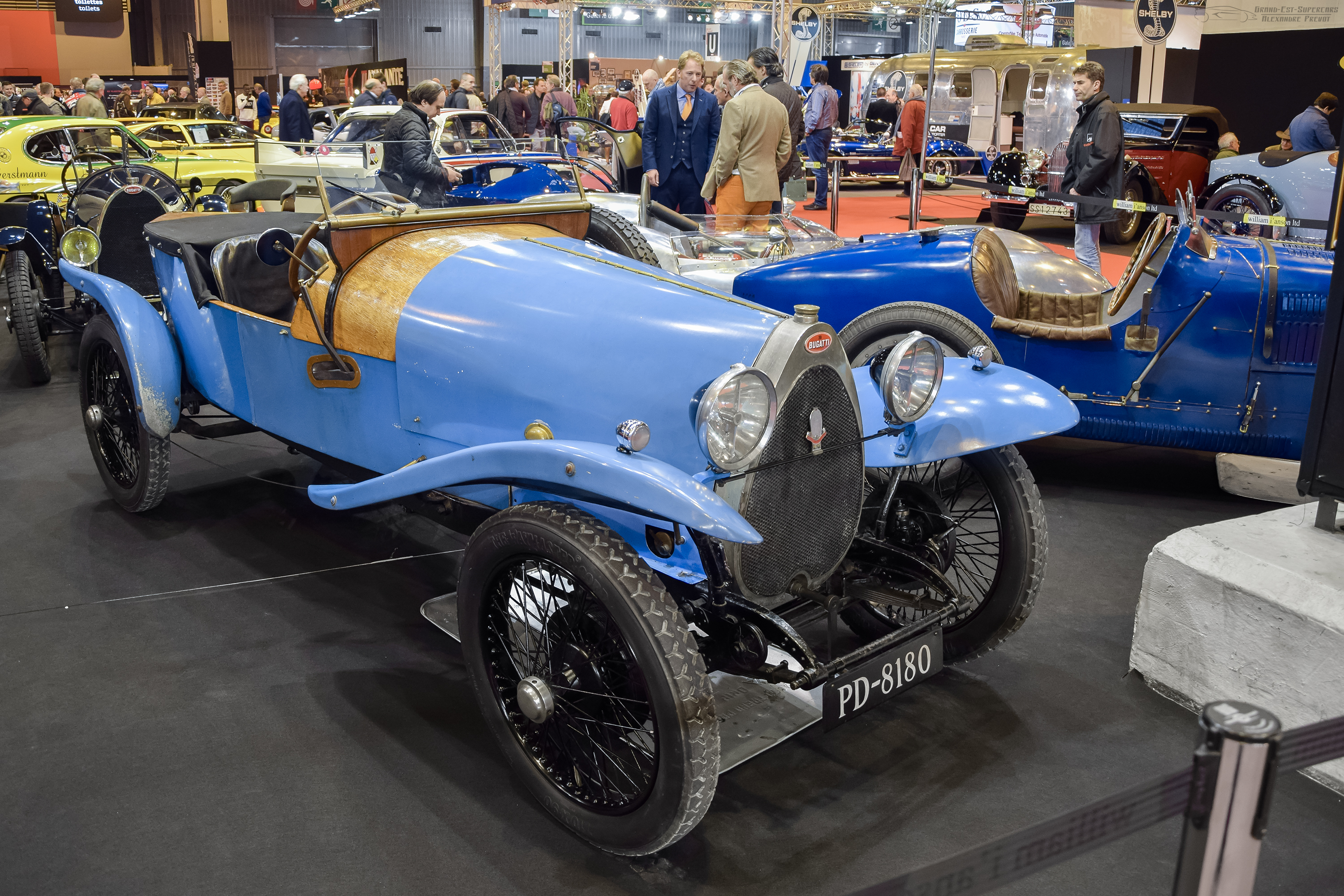

Overview
- Manufacturer: Automobiles Ettore Bugatti
- Production: 1920-1926; 2,000 produced
- Assembly: Molsheim, France
- Designer: Ettore Bugatti

Body and chassis
- Body style: Roadster
- Layout: Front Engine, RWD

Powertrain
- Engine: 1,368 cc (1.4 L) I4; 1,453 cc (1.5 L) I4; 1,496 cc (1.5 L) I4
- Power output: 20–40 bhp (20–41 PS; 15–30 kW); 67 N⋅m (49 lb⋅ft)
- Transmission: 4-speed Manual

Dimensions
- Wheelbase: 2,550 millimetres (100 in)
- Length: 4,300 millimetres (170 in)
- Width: 1,300 millimetres (51 in)
- Height: 1,160 millimetres (46 in)
- Curb weight: 482 kg (1,062 lb)

This updated version of the Type 17 was built from 1913 as the Type 23. It also had the oval radiator of the Type 22. Post World War 1, Bugatti capitalized on the racing success of the Type 13 "Brescia" with the full-production postwar Brescia Tourer. From 1914 or thereabouts, the 17 also received the multivalve Brescia engine. 2,000 examples of this engine type were built from 1920 through 1926, making it the first full-production multivalve car ever made.

The engine was initially the same 66 mm (2.60 in) bore, 1.4-litre, two-valve unit as in the earlier models. Towards the end of 1920, the bore was increased to 68 mm (2.68 in), becoming a 1.45-litre engine. A year or two later, displacement went up to a full 1.5 litres, thanks to a bore expanded yet again, to 69 mm (2.72 in).
