= Motor Sport (magazine) =

Motor racing magazine

- July 2024 cover
- Editor: Joe Dunn
- Categories: Motor racing
- Frequency: Monthly
- Publisher: Motor Sport Magazine Limited
- First issue: 1924
- Company: Motor Sport Magazine Limited
- Country: United Kingdom
- Language: English
- Website: www.motorsportmagazine.com
- ISSN: 0027-2019

Motor Sport is a monthly motor racing magazine, founded in the United Kingdom in 1924 as the Brooklands Gazette. The name was changed to Motor Sport for the August 1925 issue. The magazine covers motor sport in general, although from 1997 to 2006 its emphasis was historic motorsport. It remains one of the leading titles on both modern and historic racing.

The magazine's photo library is currently managed by LAT Images, which founded as Motor Sport photographic division by Wesley J. Tee in the 1960s and later spun-off as a stand-alone affiliated company. The magazine's monthly podcasts have featured Christian Horner, Mario Andretti, Patrick Head, Frank Williams, John McGuinness and Gordon Murray.

In 1939, the magazine incorporated its rival Speed (the organ of the British Racing Drivers' Club).

== Editors ==
- 1936–1991: Bill Boddy
- ? – December 1996: Simon Arron
- April 1997 – ?: Andrew Frankel (acting editor January 1997 – March 1997)
- September 2000 – March 2005: Paul Fearnley
- April 2017 – May 2018: Nick Trott
- May 2018 – present: Joe Dunn

== Contributors ==
- Harold Nockolds, Continental Correspondent. He apparently filled the role by remaining in London and translating articles from overseas newspapers.
- Denis Jenkinson, Continental Correspondent. Known as 'Jenks' or by his initials DSJ, Jenkinson travelled to all the Grands Prix to cover them for the magazine. His race reports were the only way that many readers could keep up with Grand Prix racing due to the lack of coverage elsewhere. Jenks was himself a talented racing driver. In competition he is best known for success as a passenger in sidecar racing, and as navigator for Stirling Moss in the 1955 Mille Miglia, which they won at a record speed of just under 100mph. Jenkinson's report on this event is considered one of the finest pieces of motoring journalism ever.
- Mark Hughes, Grand Prix Editor (current). Gordon Cruickshank, Editor at Large.

Lucas di Grassi, Dario Franchitti, Sébastien Buemi and 2013 BTCC Champion Andrew Jordan also write for the website on a monthly basis alongside staff writers Simon Arron, Damien Smith, Paul Fearnley, Gordon Kirby, Andrew Frankel, Rob Widdows, Mat Oxley.

== Publishers ==
- 1924 – Radclyffe's, Technical Publishers, 65 Victoria Street, London S.W.1
- 1936 – Wesley J. Tee
- 1997 – Haymarket (With LAT and Motoring News)
- 2006 – Chelsea Magazines (separated from LAT and Motorsport News which retained by Haymarket)
- 2009 – Motor Sport Magazine Limited
