= Vintage Sports-Car Club =

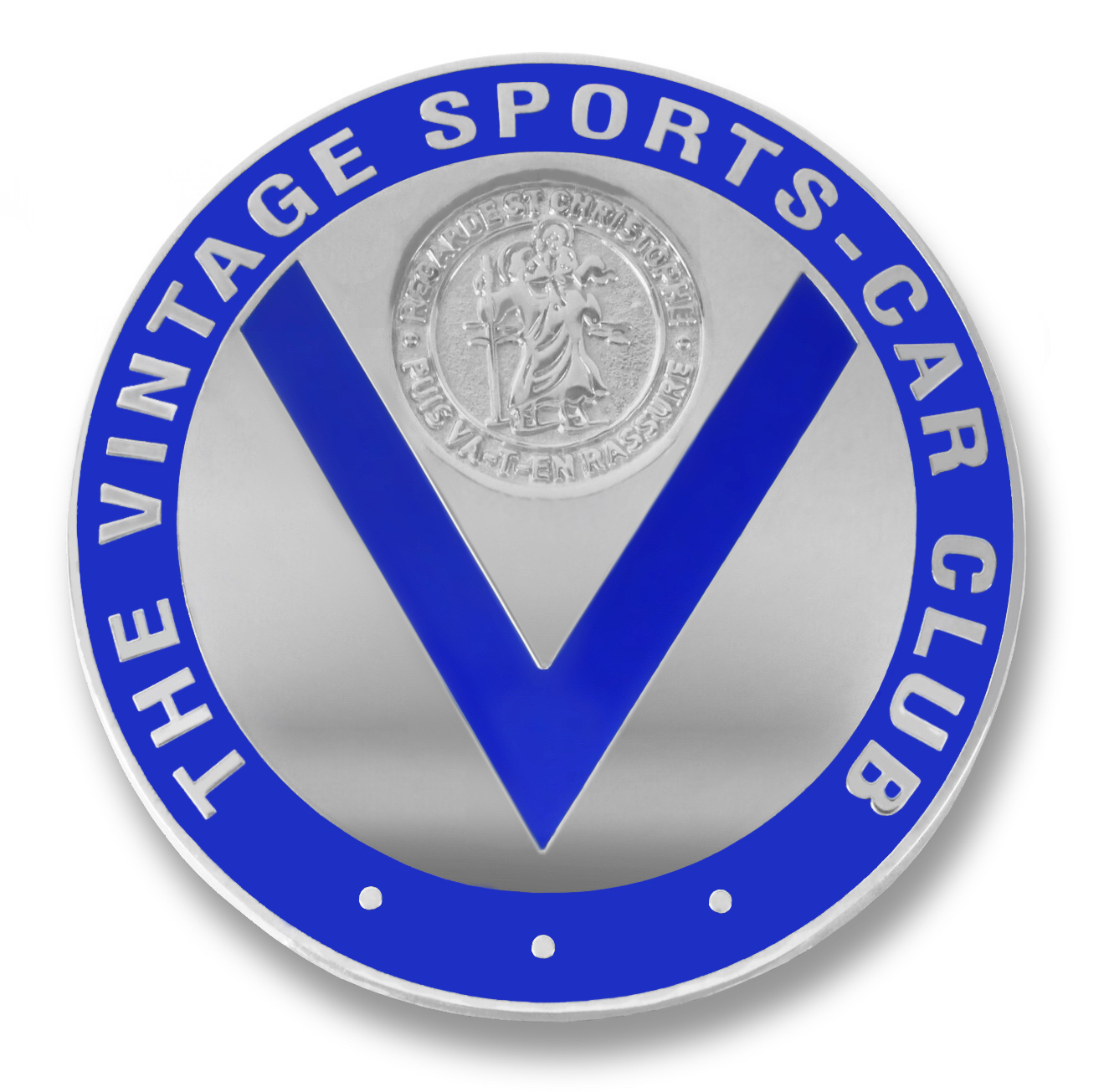
- VSCC Logo
- Abbreviation: VSCC
- Formation: 1934
- Headquarters: 1 Hockley Court, 2401 Stratford Road, Hockley Heath, B94 6NW
- Location: Oxfordshire
- Region served: UK
- Members: 5600 (4000 in 1961)
- Website: vscc.co.uk/

The Vintage Sports-Car Club or VSCC is an active British motor racing club that organises events, both competitive and social, throughout the United Kingdom. These are primarily, but not exclusively for pre-1940 cars.

The Club organises around 40 events a year.

Race Meetings are organised at venues including Silverstone (Spring Start in April), Mallory Park, and Donington Park.

Car Trials are primarily off road events with locations including the Scottish Trial, Derbyshire, Herefordshire, Welsh, Lakeland and Cotswold Trials.

Speed Hill Climbs and Sprints are held at venues including Curborough, Shelsley Walsh and Prescott.

Navigational Rallies, including the Measham Night Rally, are held in different locations that often change after a fixed period.

Non-competitive social runs and touring assemblies are held nationwide and more informally.

The club was established in October 1934 by five founder members: Colin Nicholson, Bruce Nicholson, Ned Lewis, Harry Bowler and Vivian Brookes. The VSCC was known initially as the Veteran Sports-Car Club, but within a month, by November 1934, was known as The Vintage Sports-Car Club, to avoid confusion with the Veteran Car Club of Great Britain.

Its aim was to promote the pastime of motoring, the VSCC was first started in order to allow the "not so rich" to enjoy historic motoring. Tim Carson joined the committee in 1935 and Tom Rolt in 1938, with S. C. H. Davis having become president in 1937.

Established guidelines made the club principally for cars built before 1931. This generally remains in force, although cars built before the Second World War but conforming to standards set in 1931 are also eligible to compete.

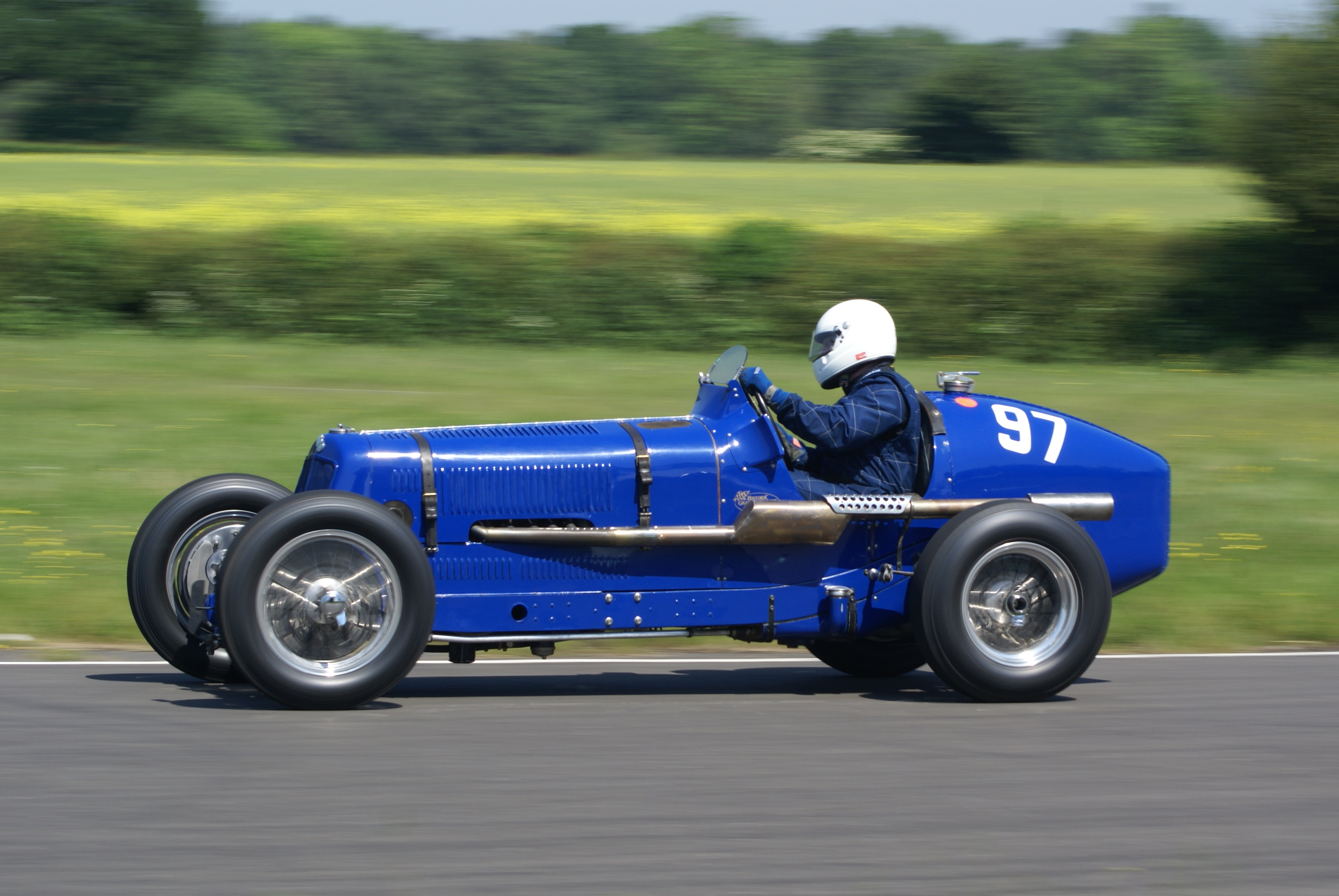
1937 E.R.A. 12C at VSCC Curborough Speed Trials 2009

As well as social events (tours, and 'Concours' gatherings), the club, which has a membership of around 5,000, organises a range of motoring competitions such as driving tests, hill climbs, races, road rallies, trials and sprints. Their most famous race is held at Silverstone Circuit in April of every year.
