= Allard M2 =

Allard M2 / M2X

Overview
- Manufacturer: Allard Motor Company
- Production: 1951 (M2); 1951-1952 (M2X)

Powertrain
- Engine: 3.6 L V8; 4.4 L V8 (M2X only)

Dimensions
- Wheelbase: 2,844.8 mm (112 in)
- Length: 4,724.4 mm (186 in)
- Kerb weight: 998 kg (2,200 lb)

Chronology
- Predecessor: Allard M

The Allard M2 is a sports car manufactured by the British Allard Motor Company during 1951 and replaced the M. The M2 was often called "the Whale" due to its new front design featuring an "A" grille and large one-piece bonnet and integrated wings. Only seven were built before it was replaced at the end of 1951 by the M2X.

Launched in 1951 to replace the M, the new M2 was not well received and only seven were sold. The M2 is a two-door, four-seater convertible, powered by the same Ford 3.6 litre (3622 cc) engine as the precious M. The M2 is equipped with a three-speed gearbox, and could reach a top speed of 85 mph. The body is constructed with aluminium panels.

== Allard M2X ==
Poor sales of the M2 resulted in the updated M2X being released at the end of 1951. The M2X is in effect the convertible version of the P1 coupe. New front suspension, shared with the J2, allowed more space in the cockpit. The M2X offered the same 3.6 V8 but with the gear change moving back to the centre. A larger 4.4 L V8 was also available.

In production until 1952, 25 M2X were built.
