= Allard J2X-C =

Racing car

- Category: Group C
- Constructor: Allard
- Designers: Hayden Burvill; John Iley (aerodynamics)

Technical specifications
- Chassis: Carbon-fibre and aluminium honeycomb two-piece monocoque
- Suspension (front): Double wishbone suspension, with push-rod actuated coil springs over dampers
- Suspension (rear): Double wishbone suspension, with push-rod actuated coil springs over dampers
- Length: 4,799 mm (188.9 in)
- Width: 2,000 mm (78.7 in)
- Height: 920 mm (36.2 in)
- Axle track: 1,620 mm (63.8 in) front 1,582 mm (62.3 in) rear
- Wheelbase: 2,850 mm (112.2 in)
- Engine: Nicholson McLaren Engines-prepared Cosworth DFR, 3,494 cc (213.2 cu in) 32 valve, DOHC V8, naturally-aspirated mid-engined, longitudinally mounted
- Transmission: Modified Leyton House-March Engineering 6-speed sequential manual
- Weight: 860 kg (1,896.0 lb)
- Tyres: BF Goodrich; Goodyear

Competition history
- Notable entrants: Bob Pond Racing
- Notable drivers: Robs Lamplough
- Debut: 1993 IMSA GTP Championship Laguna Seca Raceway
Races	Wins	Poles	F/Laps
1 (3 entries)	0	0	0
- Teams' Championships: 0
- Constructors' Championships: 0
- Drivers' Championships: 0

The Allard J2X-C, or the Allard J2X as it is sometimes referred to, was a Group C sports racing car built by Allard in 1992 for use in international sports car racing events. It featured a 3.5-litre Cosworth DFR V8 engine, capable of producing around 580 hp (432.5 kW; 588.0 PS). The J2X-C had bodywork that is more reminiscent of modern Le Mans Prototypes than a conventional Group C car, but the engine proved too weak for the level of downforce, and this, coupled with the fact that Allard Holdings were liquidated during the car's development, severely restricted the J2X and prevented it ever reaching its potential. One car was built.

== Development ==
In the 1980s, Chris Humberstone, licensed the rights to the Allard name from Alan Allard, the son of the company's founder, Sidney. After a few years of wrangling, the company hired Hayden Burvill from Brun Technics to begin developing the J2X-C. He was joined in 1991 by John Iley, who was hired as the aerodynamicist, and the car was designed to have as little frontal area as possible, giving it a unique look. Although it was originally planned to use a Chevrolet small block-derived V8 engine, the car was instead fitted with a 3.5-litre Cosworth DFR V8 engine, derived from a Formula One engine, which produced about 580 hp (432.5 kW; 588.0 PS) of power and 400 lb⋅ft (542.3 N⋅m; 55.3 kg⋅m) of torque. The gearbox was also from an F1 car: a Leyton House-March Engineering 6-speed sequential manual transmission modified for endurance racing. This transmission would prove to be problematic throughout the car's lifetime.

The J2X-C used double wishbone suspension, with push-rod actuated coil springs over dampers at both ends of the car; the front suspension was mounted on the carbon-fibre monocoque, whilst the rear suspension was mounted to a carbon-fibre sub-structure that had been designed to allow quick transmission replacement. The car's radical bodywork generated a high amount of downforce; it was calculated to give approximately 5,500 lb (2,495 kg) of downforce at 150 mph (241 km/h), and 9,778 lb (4,435 kg) at 200 mph (322 km/h). However, some of the more conventional cars were able to match this level of downforce; the works Toyota TS-010s had a claimed maximum downforce of over 9,500 lb (4,309 kg), for example. It was, however, higher than the works Nissan R91CP, which had a claimed maximum of 6,438 lb (2,920 kg) at 200 mph (322 km/h), whilst the 1993 Joest-Porsche 962C had a claimed maximum of 5,584 lb (2,533 kg) at 200 mph (322 km/h).

== Racing history ==
Terai Engineering attempted to enter the J2X-C at the 500 km of Suzuka in April 1992, but the car was far from ready, and did not attend. The J2X-C was first tested on 9 July 1992, with Costas Los selected to drive it at Pembrey Circuit. He said of the car; "the J2X felt very different to a regular Group C car... Contrary to most Group C cars I had driven, it was a lot more tuneable than I was accustomed to." However, he did state that the car's lack of power-assisted steering was a problem. The team struggled to find a buyer for the car, as the Group C era was drawing to a close by 1992 and 1993; the IMSA GTP Championship was on its last legs, and the World Sportscar Championship was beginning to shift away from the category.

With the J2X-C far from being completely developed, Allard Holdings were liquidated in the first quarter of 1993, and the car was sold to Robs Lamplough for £76,000. The car's lack of straightline speed, due to a combination of undeveloped aerodynamics, the high level of downforce, and the low power of the engine, would restrict the car's racing career even further. After Lamplough had bought the car, he ran the car in the test session for the 1993 24 Hours of Le Mans; however, he was only able to finish 19th overall, and last in the car's category, even lapping slower than four of the GT cars. The car was clocked at just 172 mph (277 km/h) down the Mulsanne Straight, and this led to Lamplough opting to not run in the 24 Hours of Le Mans race. Instead, Lamplough debuted the car, with assistance from Bob Pond Racing, at the ninth round of the IMSA GTP Championship, held at Laguna Seca Raceway; ninth place overall, and last in the GTP category, was the best Lamplough could do with the car. The car never raced again.

== Later history and legacy ==
Lamplough held onto the J2X-C for a while, but eventually sold the car, which then passed through the hands of several owners before ending up in Canada. Although even conventional rivals such as the Toyota TS-010 were able to develop more downforce, the J2X-C was far from the end of its development, and various other companies had considered developing a similar style of car. Most manufacturers considered the radical bodywork just too great a risk, as Spice Engineering's lead designer, Graham Humphries, stated; "With limited resources, it was decided instead to follow the more conventional route of further developing what we knew." However, Le Mans Prototypes of the early 2000s and beyond, such as the Audi R8, the Lola B01/60 and the Lola B05/40 have all been said to use some of the lessons learned in the J2X-C.

The J2X-C was, as of 2008, in running order having been fully restored, and ran in the 2007 Goodwood Festival of Speed, as part of the Group C 25th Anniversary celebration.
