= Leslie Ballamy =

British inventor and automotive engineer

Leslie Mark Ballamy (28 December 1903 – 16 July 1991) was a British inventor and automotive engineer who had a major impact on the British motorsport scene both before the Second World War and in the post-war period. His business L.M.B. Components Ltd was located in Guildford, Surrey.

== Early life ==
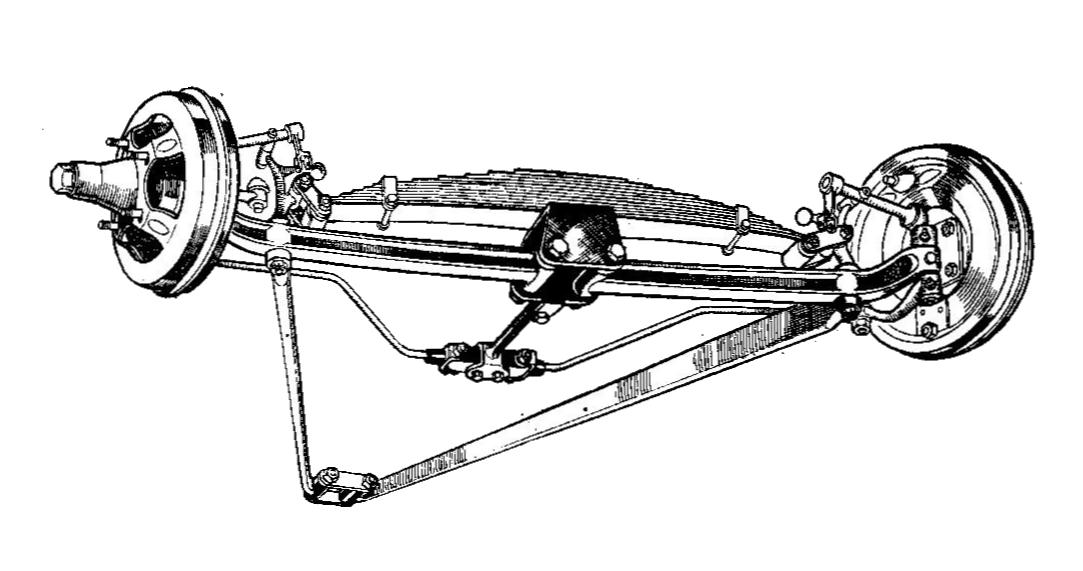
Ballamy front swing axle conversion

Ballamy was born in Walworth, England, to George William Ballamy and Elizabeth Caroline Ballamy.

== History ==
Looking to improve the handling of the Austin 7, in 1933, Ballamy split the front beam axle into twin swing arms that pivoted from a central joint. It is for this simple innovation that Ballamy became renowned. Soon afterwards, he put into production his swing axles for the Austin and the Ford 8, 10 and V8 models. Ballamy also converted more up-market cars such as Allard, Bugatti, Delage, and Bentley.

The backbone of LMB Components’ business was this suspension system which they later complemented by offering a softer spring and panhard rod combination for the live rear axle. LMB's suspension, engine and transmission conversions became a passport to success on race tracks, hill-climbs and trials venues and proved popular with some of Britain's top sportsmen. They could also be used on road cars to enhance their performance.

For 1959, Ballamy developed two ladder chassis which used a semi-swing axle front suspension featuring Citroën 2CV-style leading arms. At the rear was a transverse double cantilever layout. The ‘A’ model chassis suited Ford side valve engines while the ‘B’ model was for Ford overhead valve and BMC B-series motors. Various proprietary specials shells could be fitted. Only two of these chassis are known to have survived.

In 1961, Ballamy came to an agreement with Edwards Brothers (EB) of Stoke to retail their Debonair body shell. Mated to his chassis, he sold the stylish coupe as the LMB Debonair. Fifty examples of the Debonair were completed and the chassis went on to form the basis for the Reliant Sabre, although mated to a modified Ashley 1172 shell.

== Later years ==
In April 1962, Ballamy retired from the automotive industry. He died in Guildford in 1991.

== See also ==
- Allard, which used a similar swing axle conversion, developed independently by Sydney Allard.
