= Allard M =

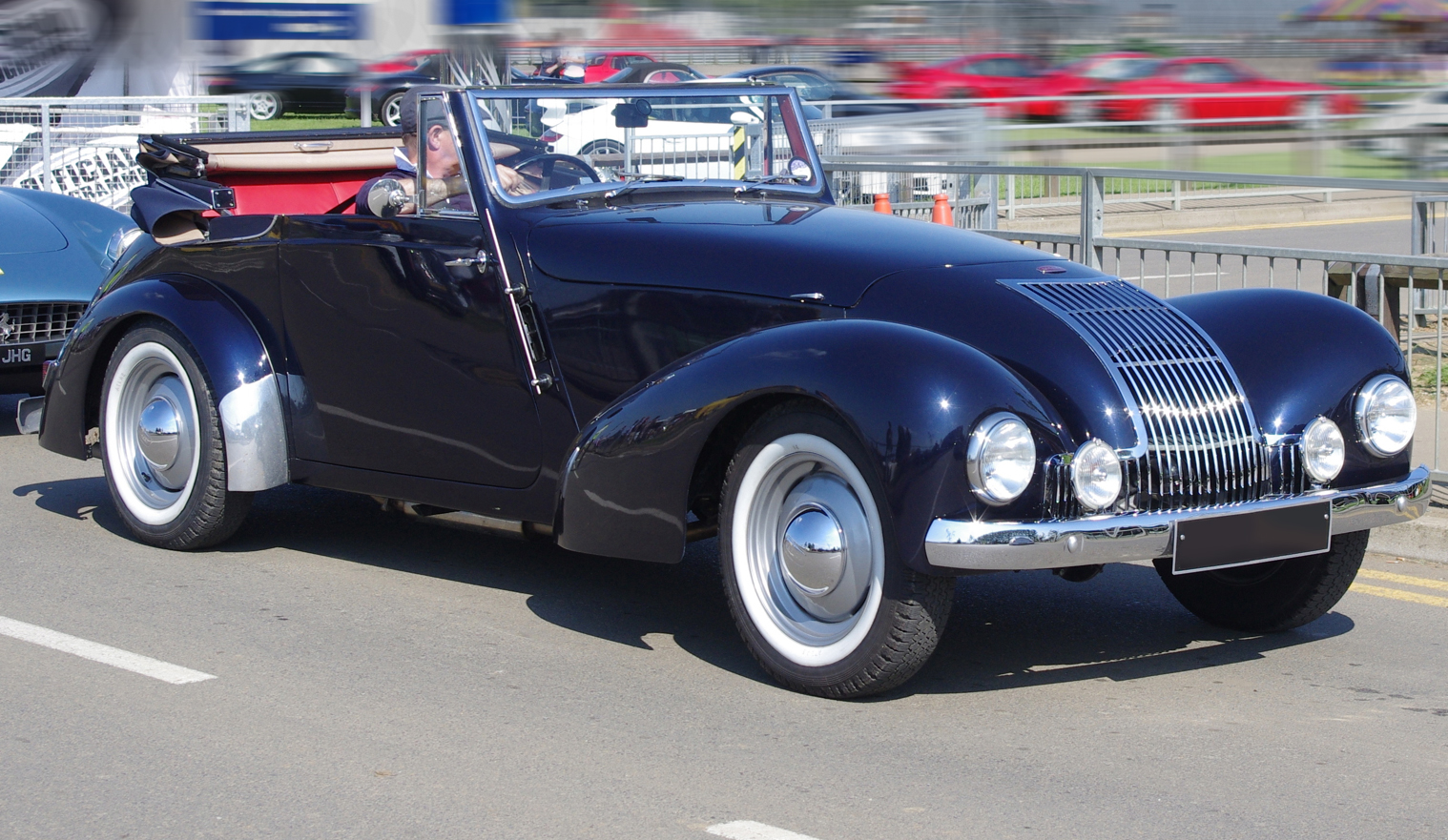

Overview
- Manufacturer: Allard Motor Company
- Also called: Allard M1
- Production: 1947-1950 (500)

Body and chassis
- Related: Allard P1

Powertrain
- Engine: 3.6 L V8

Dimensions
- Wheelbase: 2,844.8 mm (9 ft 4 in)
- Length: 4,648.2 mm (15 ft 3 in)
- Width: 1,803.4 mm (5 ft 11 in)
- Kerb weight: 1,179 kg (2,600 lb)

Chronology
- Predecessor: none
- Successor: Allard M2

The Allard M is a sports car manufactured by the British Allard Motor Company between 1947 and 1950. It is considered the first civilised sports car by Allard. Production reached approximately 500.

The M is a two-door, four-seater convertible and was marketed at the time as a Drophead Coupé. It is powered by a Ford 3.6 litre (3622 cc) engine. Later models were equipped with a Ford Pilot sourced column shift. Three cars were equipped with fixed head coupé bodywork by various coachbuilders.

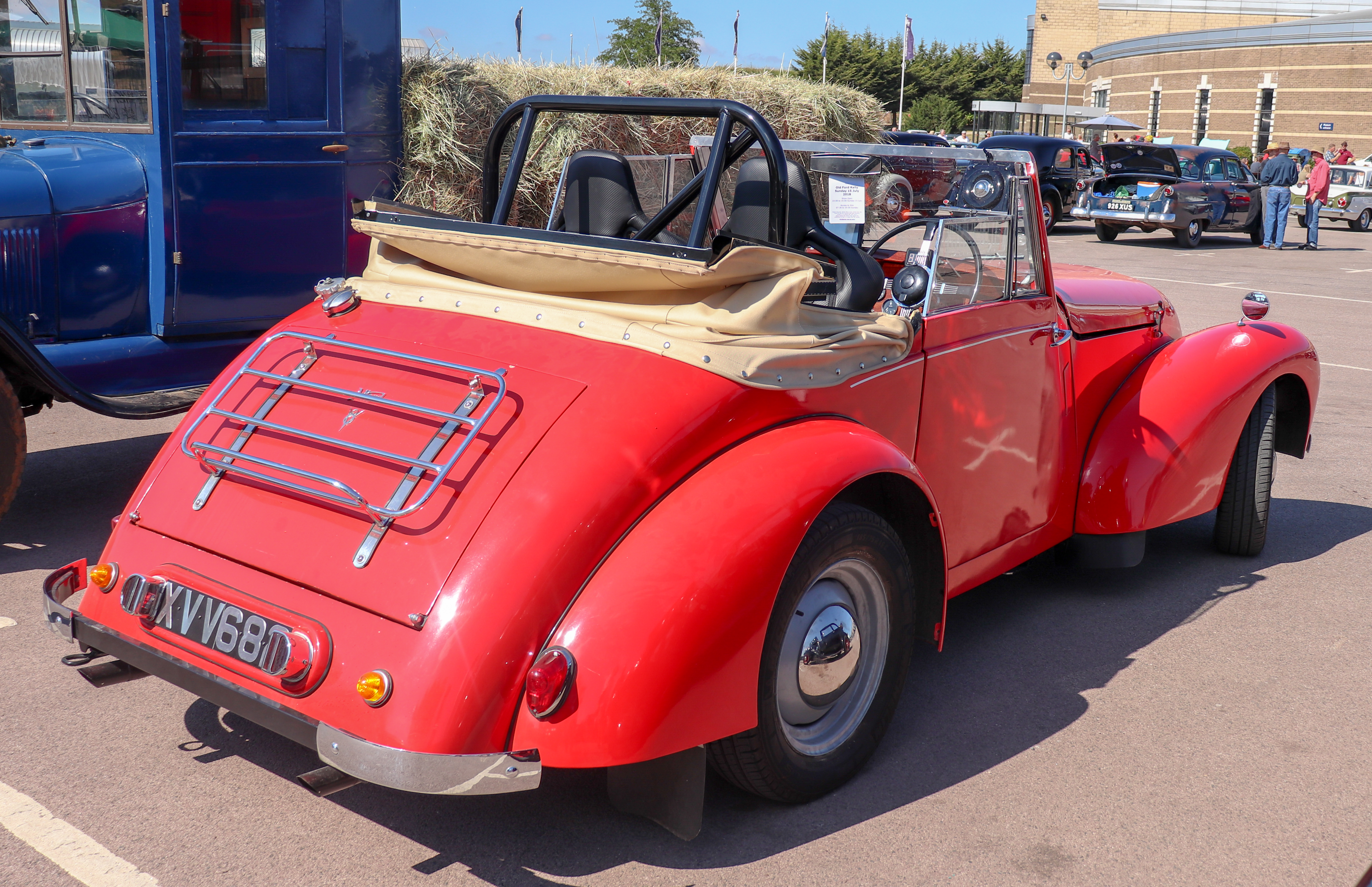
1948 M Drophead Coupé, rear view

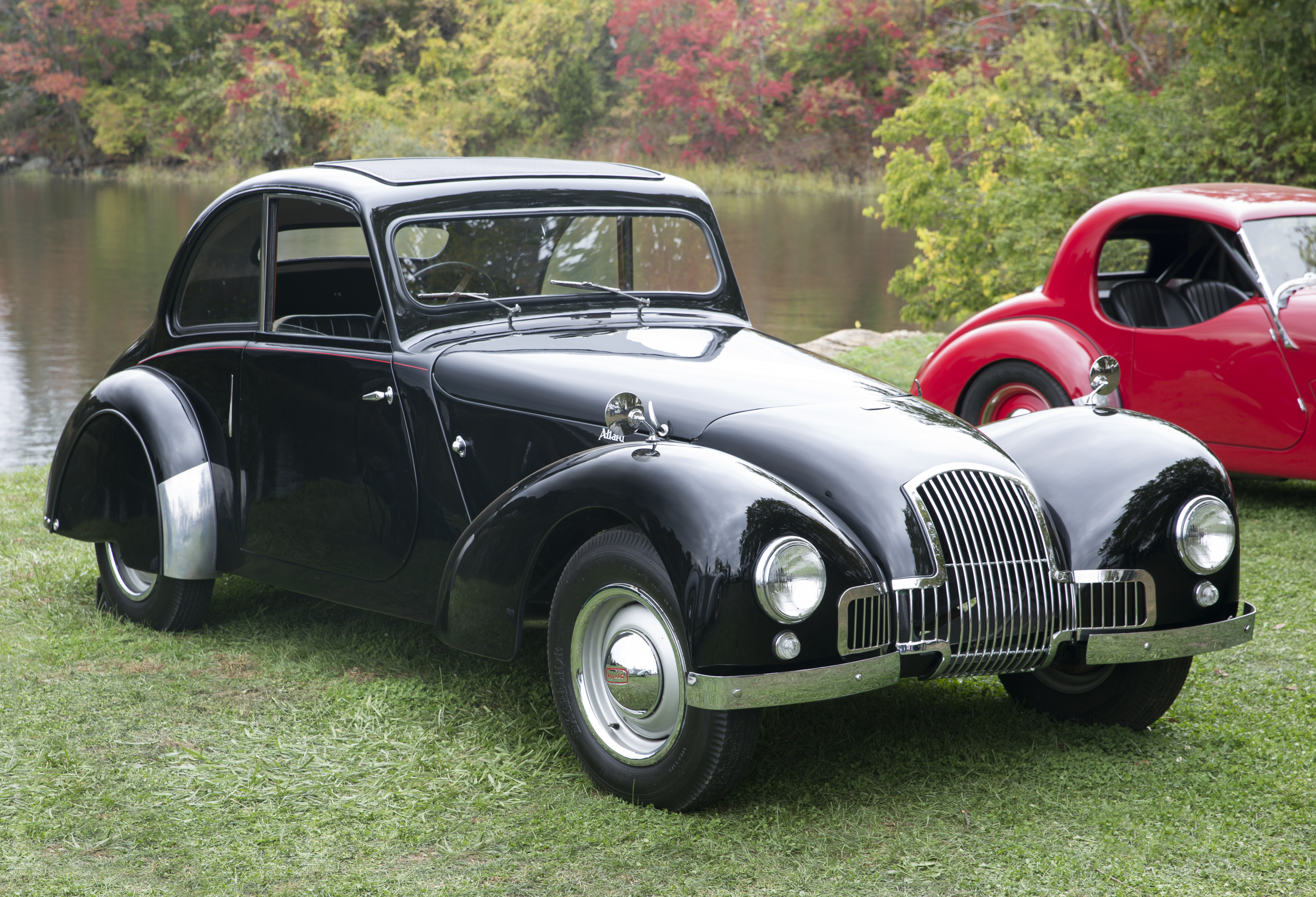
One of three M-types equipped with fixed head bodywork
