= Chris Humberstone =

English car designer

Chris Humberstone was an English car designer born in 1946. His first company was Scorpion Car Company of Dorking and then Chris Humberstone Design. Humberstone died in January 1999.

== Scorpion Car Company ==
=== 616M, 616MS and 620M ===
Humberstone's first car design as a 19 year old was the 1965 Scorpion Sovereign. There were three models made. The 1600cc engined 616M and 616MS, and the 2 litre powered 620M. The car had a Triumph Vitesse drivetrain and a Williams & Pritchard body. Humberstone was approached by Tom Gratrix of Bond cars and later found out the Gratix had used designer Trevor Fiore to restyle the Scorpion by making it into a fastback. Bond then produced it as the Bond Equipe 2 litre without Humberstone's consent. This resulted in Humberstone successfully suing Bond.

=== Mini ===
The Mini Scorpion was a 1966, Humberstone designed, replacement nose cone kit for the BMC Mini. About 1,000 of the kits were sold. In addition a lightweight version of the nose kit was made for Peter Westbury's Felday Engineering. This led to an export version to Madrid, Spain. Francis Alcaraz ran a company called Albion SA. Albion were having difficulty getting import licences to import Minis. To avoid the difficulty, Humberstone's Scorpion Car Company modified Minis by putting Scorpion noses on them and exporting them to Albion as Scorpions. Hundreds were sold to Albion, one of which won the Spanish Rally Championship.

=== Design concepts - Saluka, Quartetter, Savannah ===
The Scorpion Saluka design presented by Humberstone at the 1969 Earls Court Motor Show at the British Carriage and Automobile Manufacturers (IBCAB) stand. Only a model of the proposed car was on display.

The Quarteete was a four-seat design presented by Humberstone at the 1970 Earls Court Motor Show at the British Carriage and Automobile Manufacturers (IBCAB) stand. Only a model of the proposed car was on display.

The Savannah was a 1971 concept design only two door coupe. None were built.

== Humberstone ==
=== 408 ===
The 408 was a kit car designed, possibly in 1971, for a Hillman Imp floor pan and running gear. At least one prototype was made although the number sold is unknown.

=== Midi ===
A model for the 1977 Motorfair. The model was among several vehicles his design company, Chris Humberstone Design Ltd, exhibited at the show.

=== Excelsior (later the Rapport Excelsior) ===
First displayed at Earls Court in 1977 the Humberstone Excelsior, it was also built as the Rapport Excelsior in 1979. Humberstone was seeking other manufacturers for this car.

== H R Owen ==
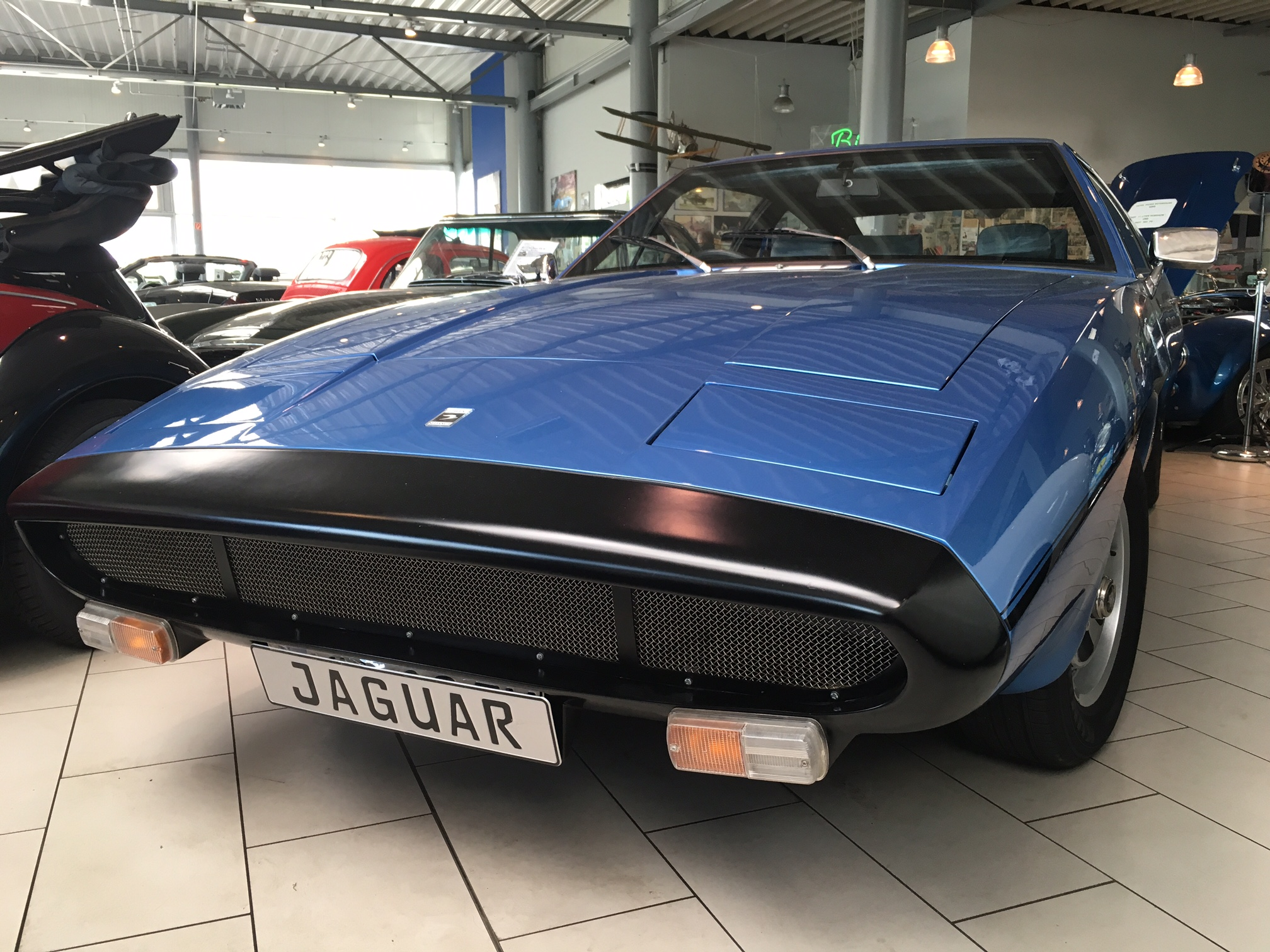
Owen Sedanca

During 1971 Humberstone worked for H.R. Owen as a salesperson. During that time he put a number of car designs to Owen as potential production models. Of these only one made was the Owen Sedanca. This car was prototyped in 1973 but because of the impact of the oil crisis none were sold until 1978 when two were purchased out of the 80 initial orders.

== Triplex Ten Twenty Special ==
The Triplex Ten Twenty special was a concept car based on an Alfa Romeo Alfasud chassis for Triplex Safety Glass Company Ltd and shown at the London Motor Show in 1976 and again at the 1977 Geneva Motor Show.

== 1979 designs ==
During 1979 Humberstone designed the Hermes APV and 3001 Space Oddity (which featured in Street Machine magazine July 1979).

== Rapport International ==
=== Ritz ===
A car using a Honda body.

=== Forte ===
Designed for Rapport with the prototype being shown at Brands Hatch in 1980. This car and three unfinished ones were acquired by Patrick Motors Group when Rapport went into receivership. It was finally modified and became the PMG Rapport Forte Estate.

== Cartel Tiger ==
A two-seat ground effect car designed in 1983.

== Racing cars ==
=== Allard ===
In the 1980s, Humberstone, who had a history of designing cars for various Formula One teams, licensed the rights to the Allard name from Alan Allard, the son of the company's founder, Sidney. After a few years of wrangling, the company hired Hayden Burvill from Brun Technics to begin developing the J2X-C. A 1991 project to bring Allard back into motor racing with the Allard J2X-C.

Humberstone also sought to produce a Lexus in conjunction with Toyota under the Allard brand name and one prototype was made using an LS400.

=== Spice Racing Cars ===
Spice Engineering had fallen into receivership and Humberstone, in a consortium involving two of its former drivers, Costas Los and Jean-Louis Ricci, bought the company.
