= Owen Sedanca =

Jaguar

The Owen Sedanca was a GT-class car built in the United Kingdom in the 1970s. Only two were ever sold.

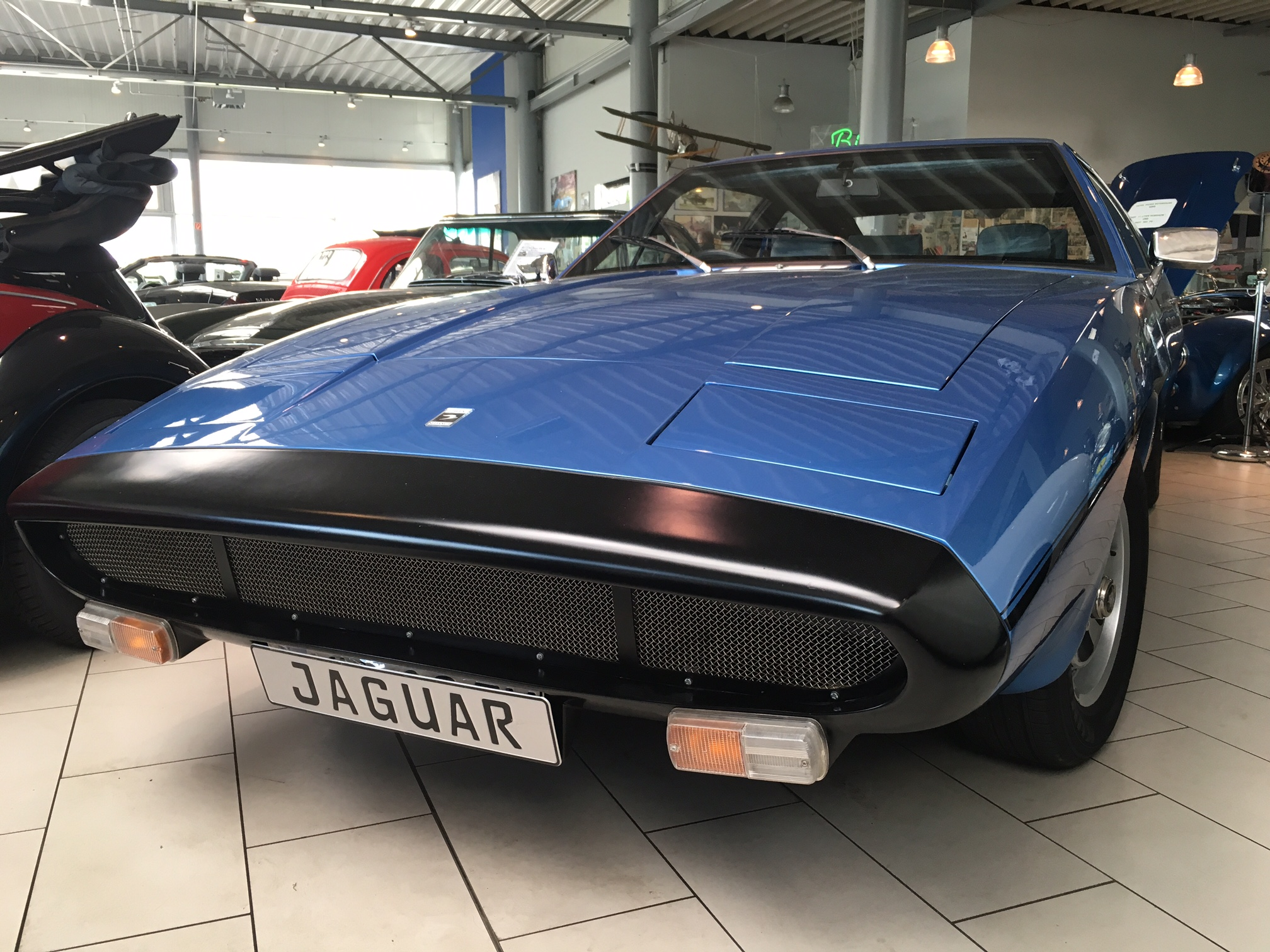
Owen Sedanca

== History ==
The Sedanca was commissioned by Gerald Ronson, owner of London-based car dealership H.R. Owen. The design was heavily inspired by the Lamborghini Espada and was penned by Chris Humberstone.

The Sedanca's hand-crafted body was placed on a Jaguar XJ6 chassis. The bodywork was built by coachbuilders Williams & Pritchard Limited. The car retained the Jaguar 4.2-litre engine alternatively the less powerful Jaguar 3600cc engine could also be fitted.

== Sales ==
The car was unveiled at Kensington in September 1973 and was priced at £8,500 – more than twice the price of the car on which it was based. Eighty orders were taken, but the 1973 oil crisis resulted in most of the 80 orders being cancelled, and the project was shelved.

In 1978, a Mr. Farid ordered a Sedanca for his son to use on the grounds of his Oxfordshire estate. He later ordered another for his younger son; this car being delivered in 1983. They were both sold, with very low mileage, when the Farid family left Britain in the late 1980s.

The two cars still exist, in addition to the original prototype. In December 2005, the 1978 car was put up for sale on eBay. The 1982 car appeared in the Bonhams Goodwood Revival auction 19 September 2026 with a pre-sale estimate of £35k to £55k.
