= Allard Palm Beach =

The Allard Palm Beach is a small British roadster built by Allard Motor Company between 1952 and 1958, with a Mark II introduced in 1956. Based on the chassis of the K3, but with only four- or six- cylinder engine options. Production only reached 80 units by the end of 1958 when manufacturing of the Palm Beach ended.

== Mark I ==
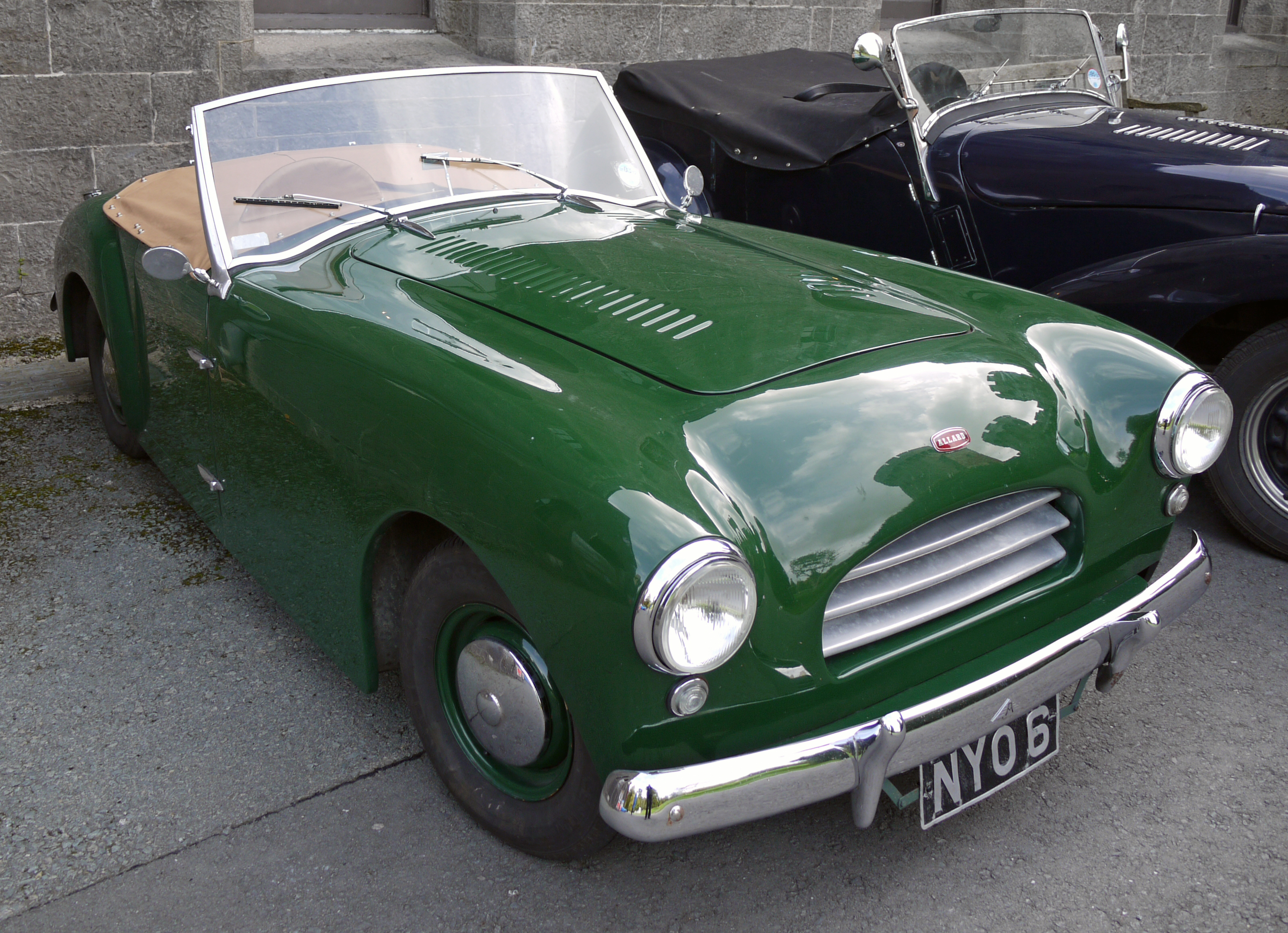
Palm Beach 2.3 Mk I

The Palm Beach was sold with a choice of four-cylinder 1.5-litre (1508 cc) engine from a Ford Consul producing 47 bhp (35 kW; 48 PS) or a six-cylinder 2.3-litre (2262 cc) engine from a Ford Zephyr producing 68 bhp (51 kW; 69 PS). There was one V8 model built to special order for an Argentinian customer, supplied new with a 4.0-litre Dodge 'Red Ram' engine.

Consul-engined cars (only eight were built) are called "21C" (C for Consul) while the six-cylinder cars are called "21Z" (Zephyr). The sole Dodge-engined car received the model code "21D".

== Mark II ==
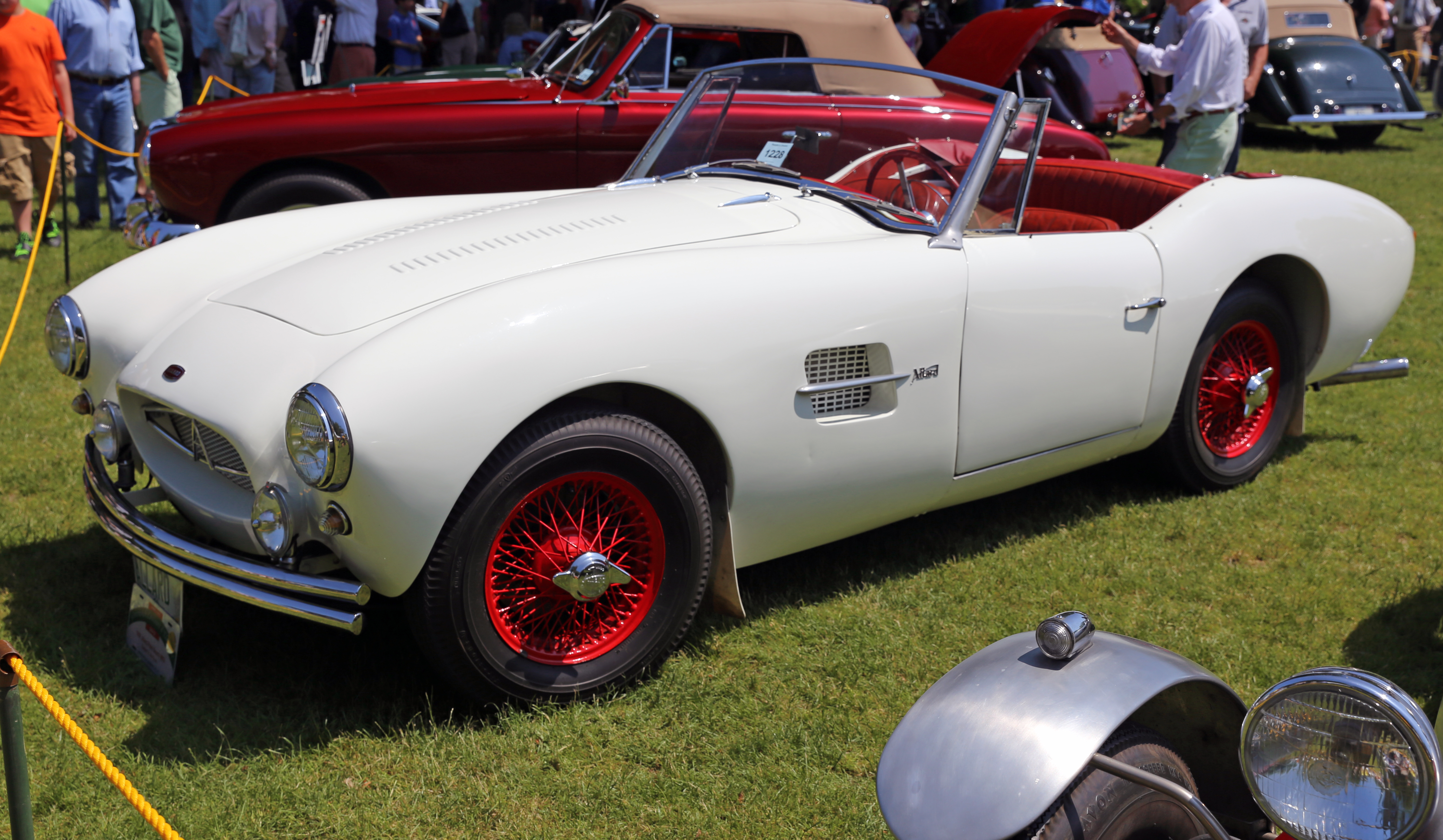
Palm Beach Mk II

Introduced in 1956, the Mark II Palm Beach dropped the four-cylinder option, and introduced the availability of a Jaguar sourced six-cylinder 3.4-litre (3442 cc) engine.
