= Allard Motor Company =

British car manufacturer

- Industry: Automotive
- Founded: 1946; 80 years ago
- Founder: Sydney Allard
- Defunct: 1958; 68 years ago
- Fate: Insolvency
- Headquarters: Clapham, England
- Owners: (1946–1966) Sydney Allard
- Website: www.allardmotorcompany.com

Allard Motor Company Limited was a London-based low-volume car manufacturer founded in 1945 by Sydney Allard in small premises in Clapham, south-west London. Car manufacture almost ceased within a decade. It produced approximately 1900 cars before it became insolvent and ceased trading in 1958. Before the war, Allard supplied some replicas of a Bugatti-tailed special of his own design from Adlards Motors in Putney.

Allards featured large American V8 engines in a light British chassis and body, giving a high power-to-weight ratio and foreshadowing the Sunbeam Tiger and AC Cobra of the early 1960s. Cobra designer Carroll Shelby and Chevrolet Corvette chief engineer Zora Arkus-Duntov both drove Allards in the early 1950s.

== Pre-war Allard Specials ==
The first Allard cars were built to compete in "trials" events – timed rally-like events on terrain almost impassable by wheeled vehicles. Built in under three weeks, the first Allard was powered by a Ford flathead V8 in a body mainly pirated from a Bugatti. The V8 was moved backward in the chassis to improve traction. The car used the American engine's high torque to great effect in slow-speed competition. It debuted at the Gloucester Cup Trials, and later won the 100 miles (160 km) event at Southport Sands.

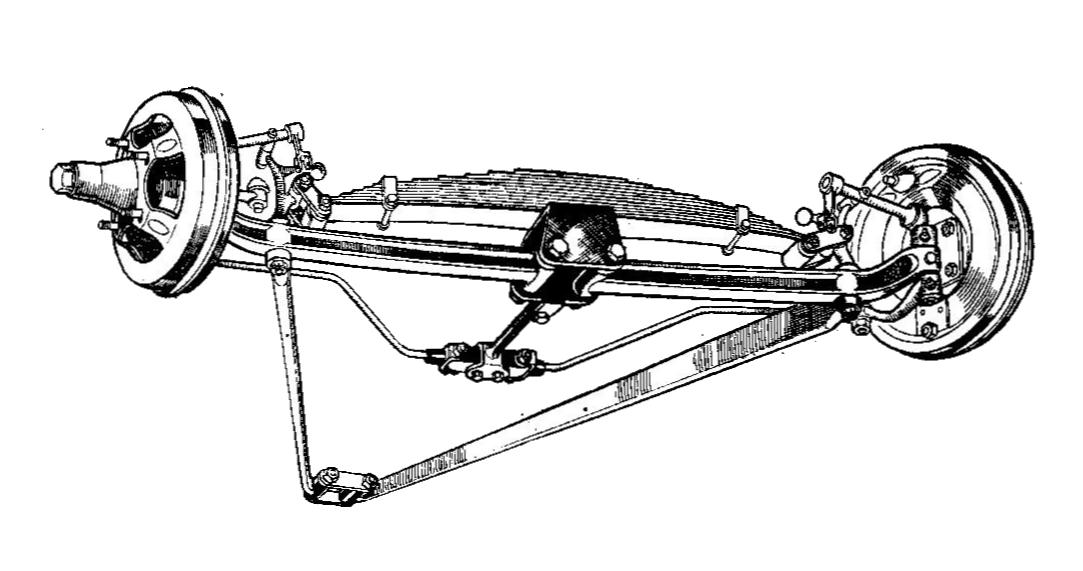
Ballamy front swing axle conversion

After a time the front beam axle was converted to independent front suspension. Leslie Ballamy's rather crude method was to cut the beam in half and mount the halves as swing axles and these swing axles were used on nearly all later Allard specials.

Further Allards were soon built to order. Allard's brother, Leslie, was a customer, while racer Ken Hutchinson purchased a 4.4-litre (270 cu in) Lincoln-Zephyr V12-powered version. It led to the pair forming a team, dubbed Tail Waggers, to race the car, which proved quite successful, including setting a new record at the Prescott hillclimb.

In 1937, Allard began producing modified Fords (in much the same way as the Chevrolet brothers had in the U.S.), selling them for £450 each. By the outbreak of war in 1939, twelve Allard Specials had been built. Sydney Allard's planned volume production was pre-empted by work on Ford-based trucks during the conflict. By the war's end, Allard had built up a substantial inventory of Ford parts.

== Post-war models ==
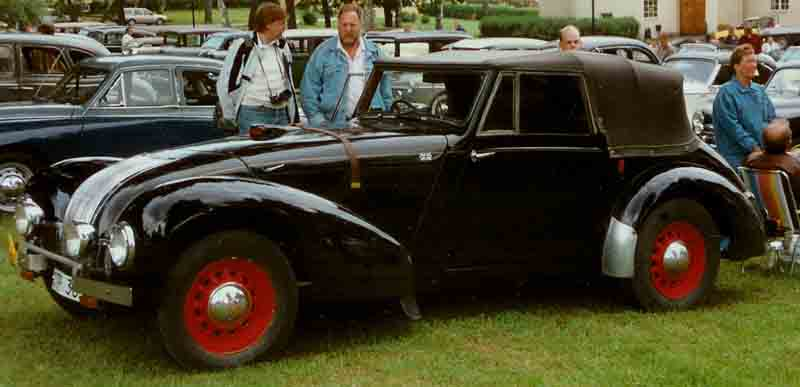
M-Type Drophead Coupé 1948

The Allard Motor Company was founded in 1945, setting up in Clapham High Street, London. Using its inventory of easy-to-service Ford mechanicals built up during World War II and bodywork of Allard's own design, three post-war models were introduced with a newly designed steel chassis and lightweight body shells: the J, a competition sports car; the K, a slightly larger car intended for road use, and the four seater L. All three were based on the Ford Pilot chassis and powered by a fairly stock 85 hp (63 kW; 86 PS) 3,622 cc (221.0 cu in) sidevalve V8 with a single carburettor and 6:1 compression, driving a three-speed transmission and low-geared rearend, for superior acceleration. Front suspension was Ballamy swing axle, rear Ford solid axle. They were bodied in aluminium by Allard's friend Godfrey Imhof. Sales were fairly brisk for a low-volume car, and demand was high for cars in general, which led to the introduction of several larger models, the drophead coupe M and P.

Allard used "J" for the short-wheelbase two-seaters, "K" for two- or three-seat tourers or roadsters, "L" for four-seat tourers, "M" for drophead (convertible) coupes, and "P" for fixed-head cars. As models were replaced, subsequent models were numbered sequentially.

=== J-types ===
==== J1 ====
Built from 1946 to 1947, the J1 was released as a two-seater competition car together with the K1 touring two-seater and the L- Type touring 4-seater. The J1 was a starkly trimmed and equipped 2-seater competition car on a 100 in (2,500 mm) wheelbase. Powered by a 140 hp (100 kW; 140 PS) 3,917 cc (239.0 cu in) overhead valve Mercury V8, the J1 had a top speed of 85 mph (137 km/h), limited by the low rear axle gearing. Only 12 were produced and went only to buyers who would rally them. They had good ground clearance and the front wings were removable. Copies driven by Allard himself, Maurice Wick, and others, and was a successful racer. Imhof won the 1947 Lisbon Rally in a J1 powered by a Marshall-supercharged version, while Leonard Potter took the Coupe des Alpes that year.

==== J2 ====
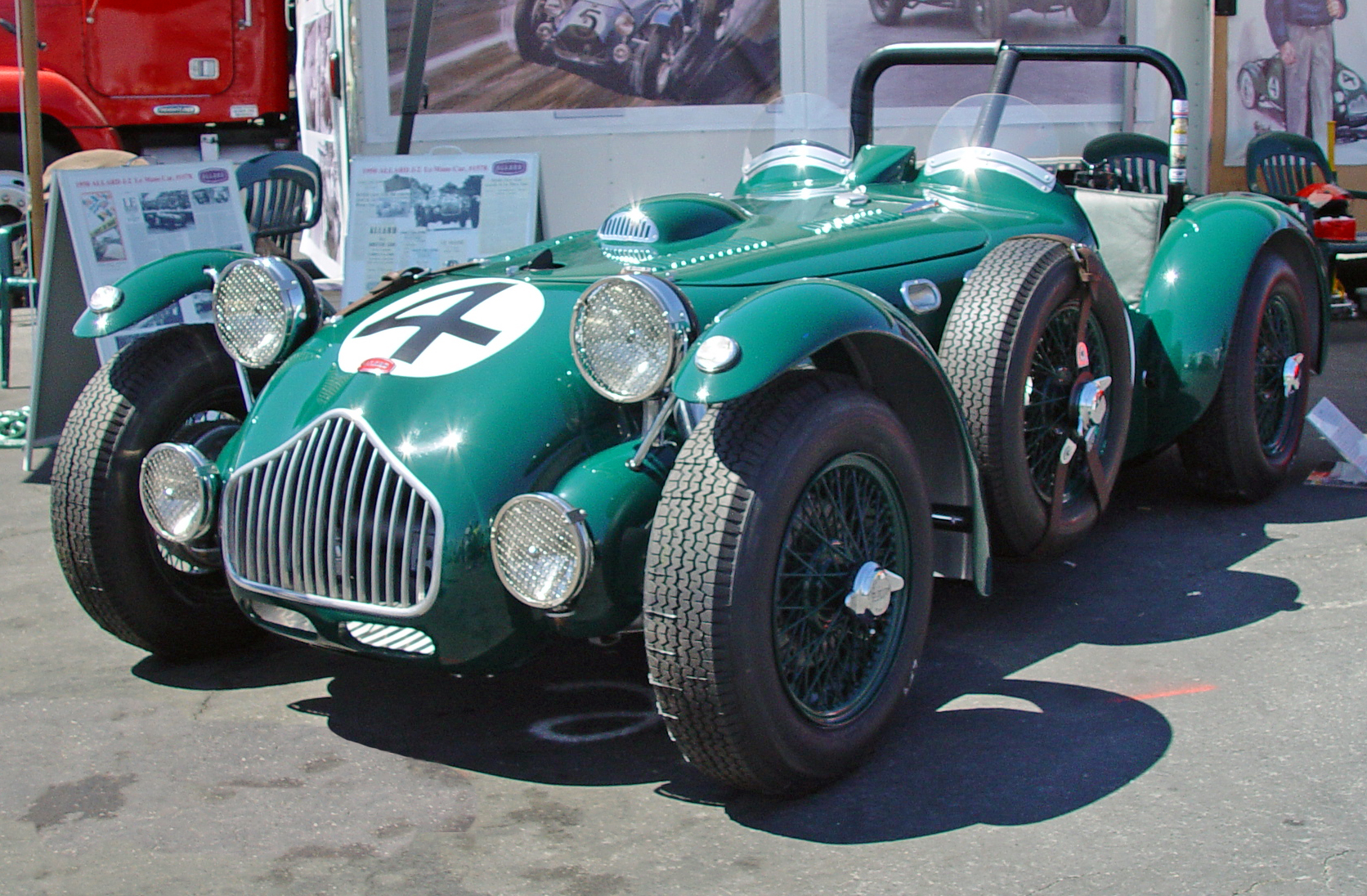
J2; this very car was third overall at Le Mans 1950

Sydney Allard soon saw the potential of the economically more vibrant – but sports car starved – U.S. market and developed a special competition model to tap it, the J2. The new roadster, weighing just 2,072 pounds (940 kg), was a potent combination of a lightweight, hand-formed aluminium body fitted with new coil spring front suspension, fitted with inclined telescopic dampers, and de Dion-type rear axle, inboard rear brakes, and 110 hp (82 kW), 267 cu in (4,375 cc) Mercury flathead V8, with the option of an Ardun hemi conversion. The J2 had a disturbing tendency to catch fire when started.

Importing American engines just to ship them back across the Atlantic proved problematic, so U.S.-bound Allards were soon shipped engineless and fitted out in the States variously with newer overhead valve engines by Cadillac, Chrysler, Buick, and Oldsmobile. In that form, the J2 proved a highly competitive international race car for 1950, most frequently powered by 331 cu in (5.4 L) Cadillac engines. Domestic versions for England came equipped with Ford or Mercury flatheads. Zora Duntov worked for Allard from 1950 to 1952 and raced for the factory Allard team at Le Mans in 1952 and 1953.

Available both in street trim and stripped down for racing, the J2 proved successful in competition on both sides of the Atlantic, including a third place overall at Le Mans in 1950 (co-driven by Tom Cole and Allard himself) at an average 87.74 mph (141.20 km/h), powered by a Cadillac V8.

J2s returned to Le Mans in 1951, one co-driven again by Cole and Allard, the other by Reece and Hitchings; Reece jumped an embankment, while the Allard car broke. They had no more success in 1952, both cars failing to finish.

Of 313 documented starts in major races in the 9 years between 1949 and 1957, J2s compiled 40 first-place finishes; 32 seconds; 30 thirds; 25 fourths; and 10 fifth-place finishes. Both Zora Duntov and Carroll Shelby raced J2s in the early 1950s. Ninety J2s were produced between 1950 and 1952.

==== J2X ====
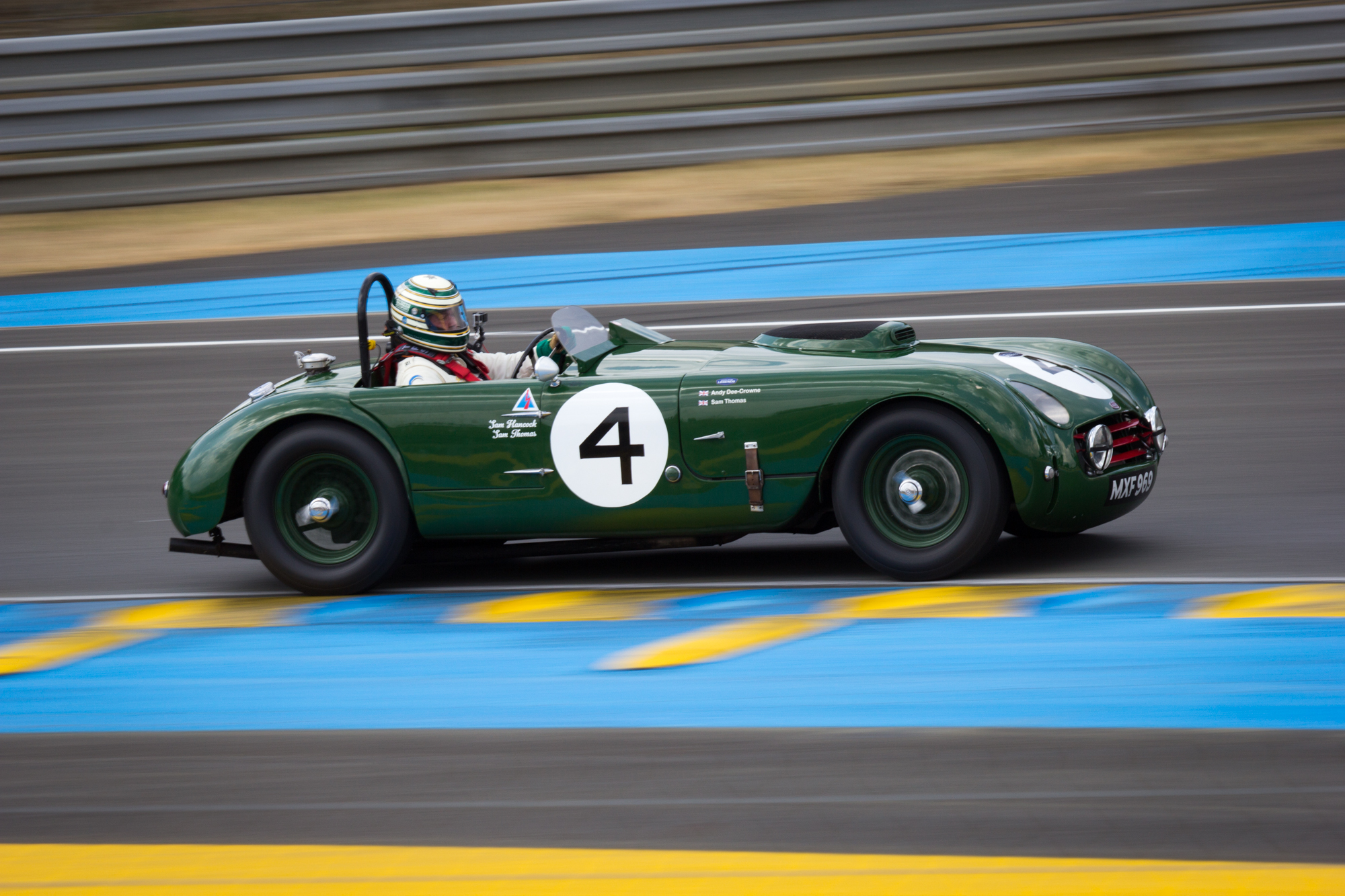
Allard J2X as seen in 1952 at Le Mans, 2015

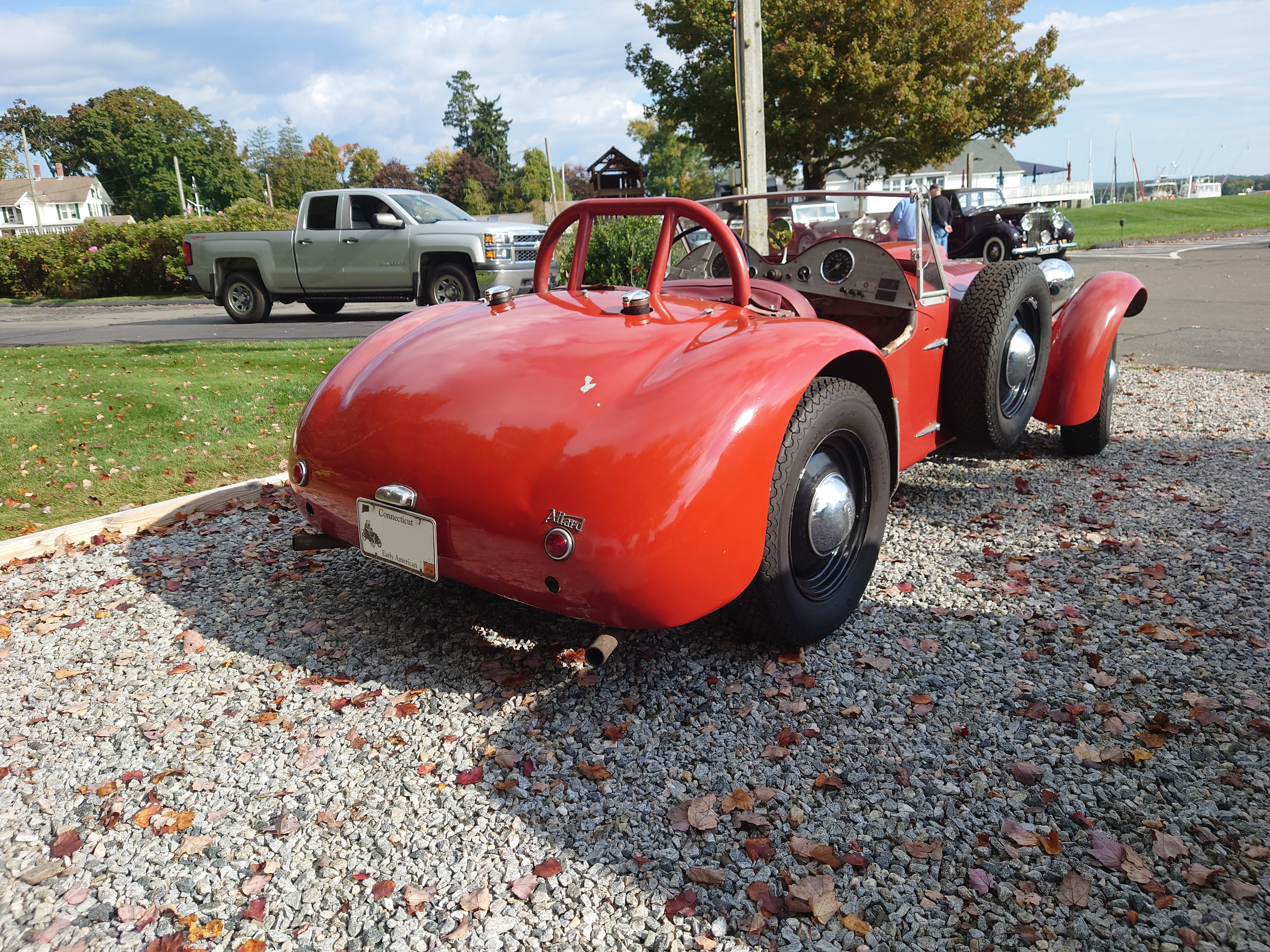
The rear of a roadworthy Allard J2X

In an effort to extend a line growing obsolete in the face of advances in sports car design, Allard introduced an 'improved' model in late 1951, the J2X (extended). The chassis remained unchanged from the previous J2, but in an attempt to improve handling, the front suspension's rear attaching radius rods were redesigned with forward ones, which required a forward cross member and extending the nose past the front wheels. This, in turn, allowed the engine to be moved forward 7 1/2 in (190 mm), yielding more cockpit room. The nose was lengthened some 6 1/2 in (170 mm) to accommodate the change.

In standard form, the spare wheel was carried hidden on top of the rear-mounted fuel tank, but either version could carry one or two side-mounted spares. This allowed the use of a 40 gallon long distance fuel tank.

Arriving later, during a time when sports racing car design was developing rapidly, the J2X was not as successful in international racing as the J2, as it was not as competitive compared to more advanced C- and D-type Jaguars, alongside Mercedes, Ferrari, and Maserati works entries. Thus, it headlined less often in major international races and of 199 documented major race starts in the 9 years between 1952 and 1960, J2X's garnered 12 first-place finishes; 11 seconds; 17 thirds; 14 fourths; and 10 fifths.

One J2X chassis was given custom magnesium-alloy bodywork by Essex Aero.

==== JR ====
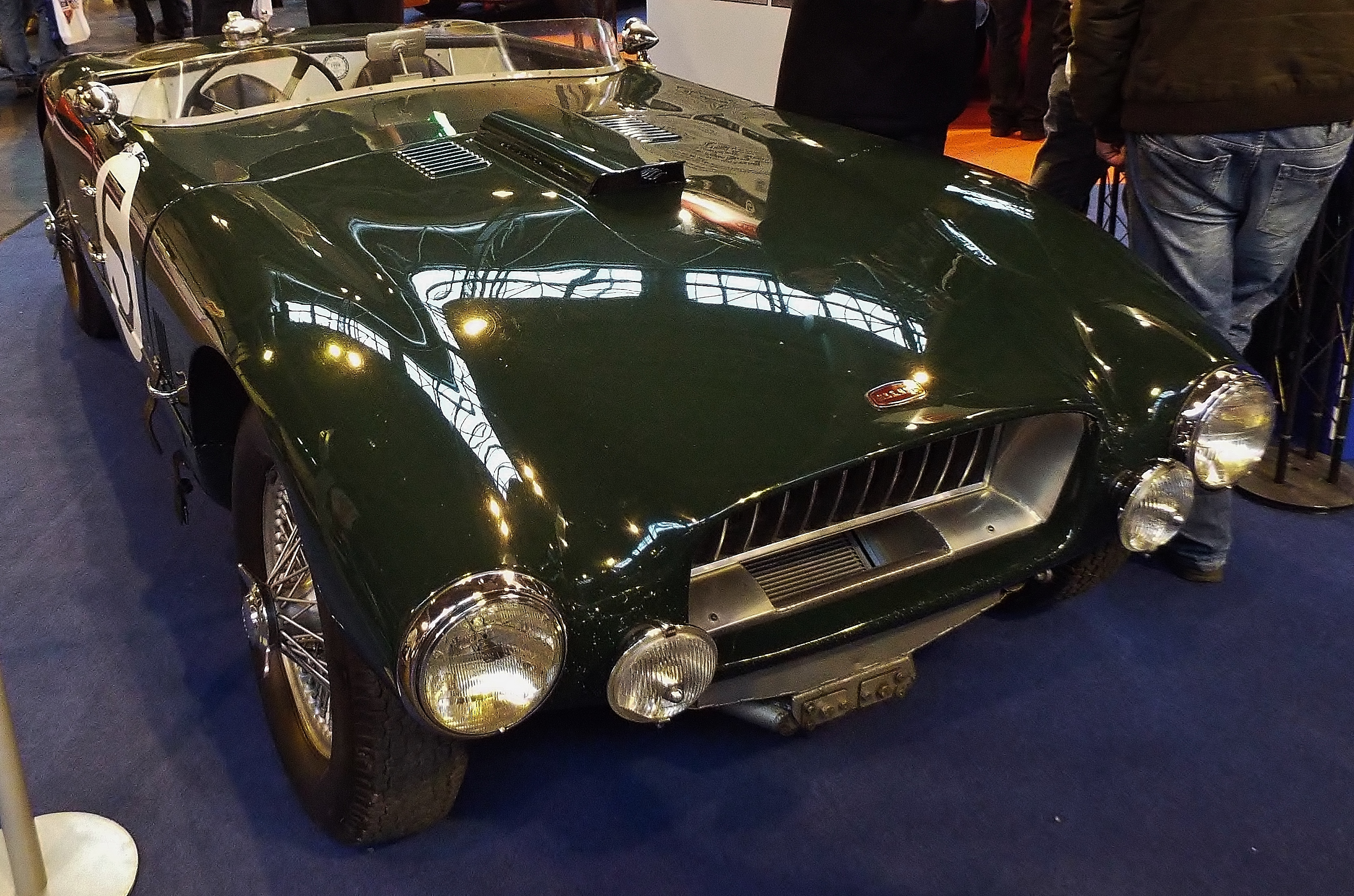
Allard JR

This 1953 car was a lightweight specialist racer, powered by a Cadillac engine claimed to produce 300 hp (220 kW; 300 PS). Entered at Le Mans that year, the Allard/Fotheringham-Parker car suffered a broken rear suspension, while the Duntov/Merrick car also retired. This was the marque's last effort at Le Mans. Seven cars were built in total, with the last car finished in 1956.

=== K-types ===
==== K1 ====
Allard K1
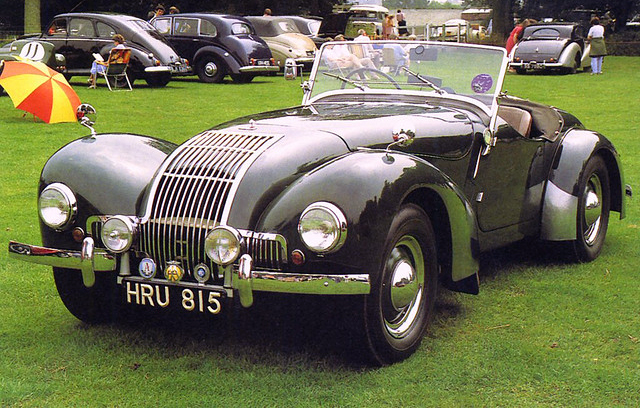
- 1949 Allard K1

Overview
- Production: 1946–1949

Powertrain
- Engine: Ford Britain L-head V8; Canadian Mercury L-head V8
- Transmission: 3-speed manual

Dimensions
- Wheelbase: 2,690 mm (106.0 in)
- Curb weight: 1,120 kg (2,460 lb)

Built from 1946 to 1948, the K1 used a 106 in (2,700 mm) wheelbase and was powered by a tuned version of the 221 cu in (3,622 cc) V8, with 7:1 compression, producing 95 hp (71 kW; 96 PS). The frame was made up from stamped steel channel sections by Thomsons of Wolverton specially for Allard. Side rails and cross members were designed to fit the Allard trailing link, transverse leaf independent front suspension and live rear axle. Production totaled 151 and fitted with the same engine options as the J1 the K1 could reach 86–90 mph (140–145 km/h).

==== K2 ====
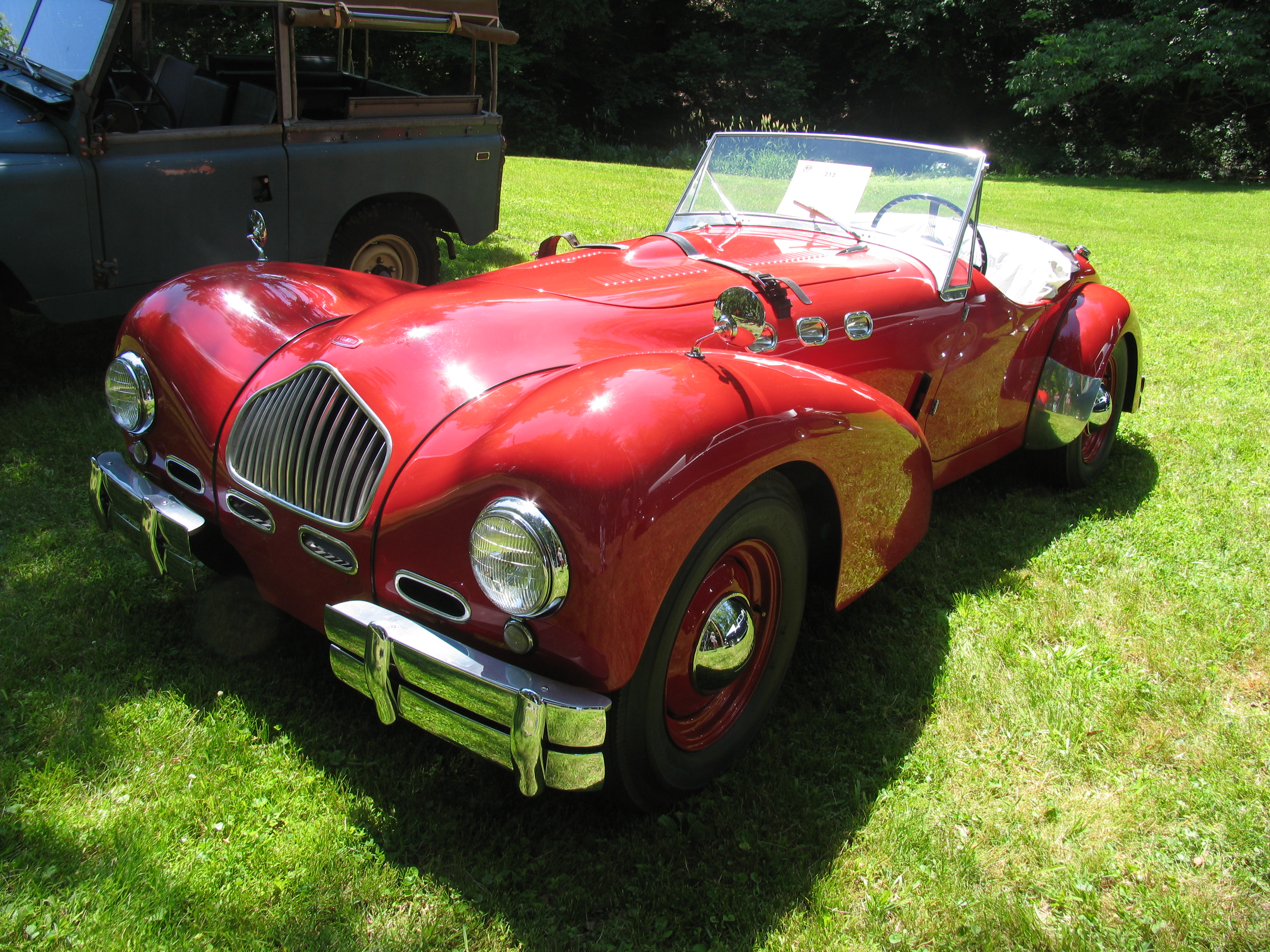
Allard K2

The K2 is a 2-seater sports car produced from 1950 to 1952. It was offered with Ford and Mercury V8s in the home market and with Chrysler and Cadillac V8s in the USA. 119 were built.

==== K3 ====
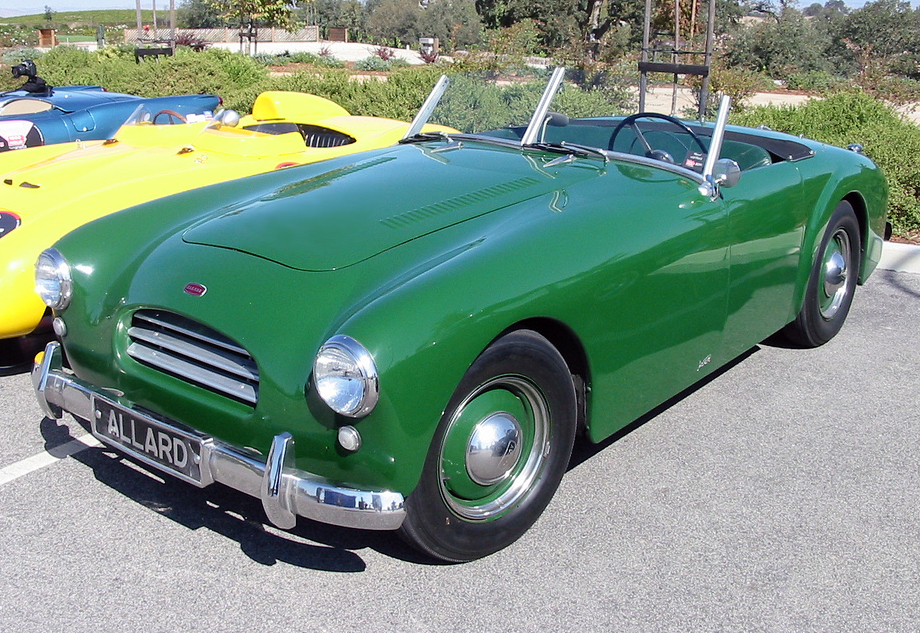
1953 K3

In 1952, Allard adapted the Palm Beach into the K3, an attempt to offer a more civilized (Note: "Civilized" in this context means for street use.) variant of the more track-oriented J2 and J2X models. Exported to America as a potential "Corvette slayer" of which Dodge dealers had been seeking, it featured one of the most powerful engines of its era, the 331 cu in (5,420 cc) Chrysler hemi engine, fitted with a pair of 4-barrel carburetors. Essentially an up-enginged, rebodied Palm Beach, it failed to find a niche in either market in spite of its performance. The car has been sold at up to US$250,000 in auctions. 62 examples were built, of which 57 were delivered to the United States.

=== L-type ===
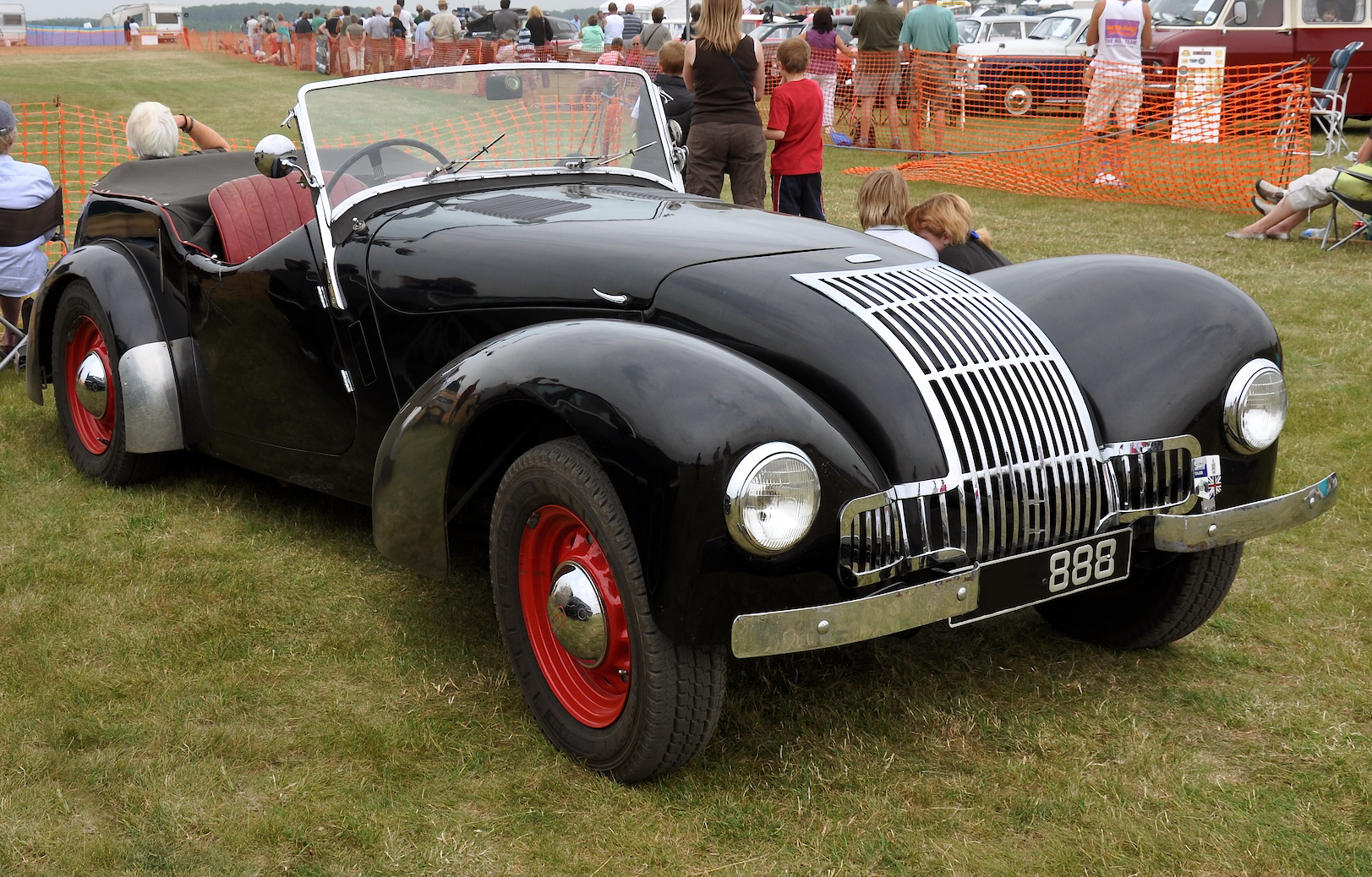
1948 Allard L

The L is a 4-seat roadster, produced from 1946 to 1950. It was on a 112-inch (2.8 m) wheelbase and available with a choice of 3622 cc (221.0 cu in) Ford V8 or 4375 cc (267.0 cu in) Mercury engines. The top speed is estimated to be 85 mph (137 km/h). Priced at a little more than £1000, 191 were produced.

=== P-types ===
==== P1 ====
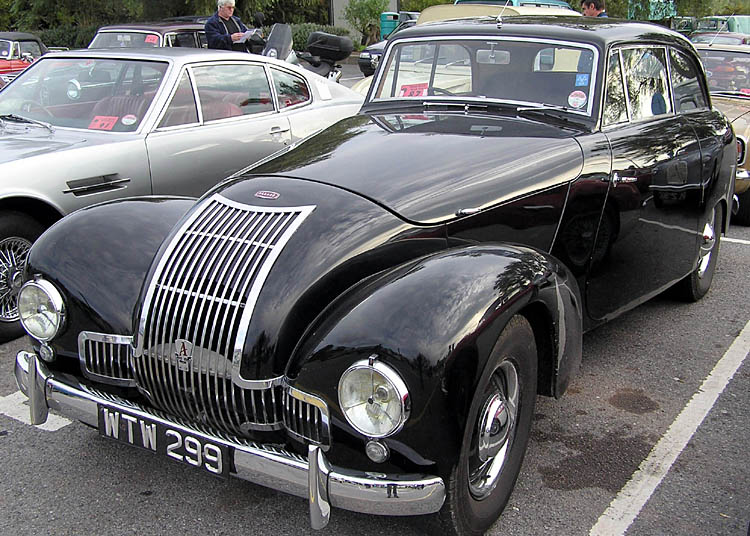
1948 P1 Sports

Also known as the Allard 3.6-litre Saloon, the P1 was a five-seat, two-door sports saloon produced between 1949 and 1952. The cars used Ford engines and transmissions, and included a "Sports" model. In 1952 an Allard P1, driven by Sydney Allard, along with Guy Warburton and Tom Lush (navigator) won the Monte Carlo Rally.

The P1 was popular with doctors and solicitors in its day. During the model's run 559 vehicles were produced, today it is believed that fewer than 45 remain worldwide.

==== P2 Monte Carlo ====
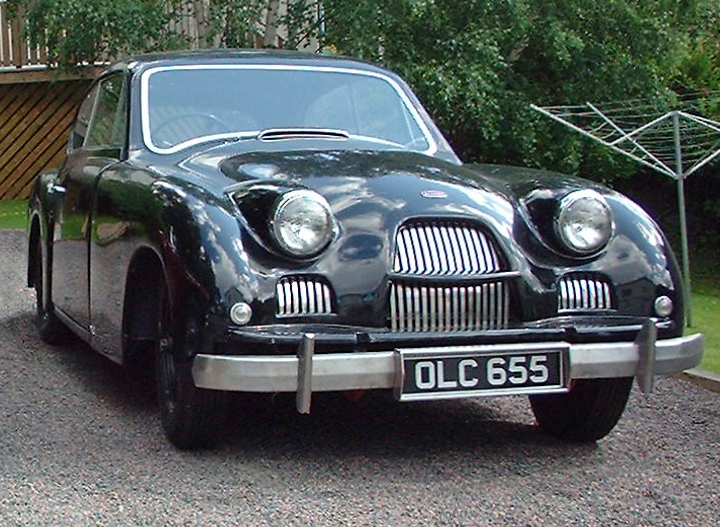
1953 Allard P2 Monte Carlo

The P2 Monte Carlo was a 2-door saloon variant of the K3, produced from 1952 to 1955. It utilised a wood frame with aluminium panels on a 112-inch wheelbase and was offered with 3.6-litre Ford Pilot V8 and 4.4-litre Mercury V8 engines. 11 were built.

==== P2 Safari ====
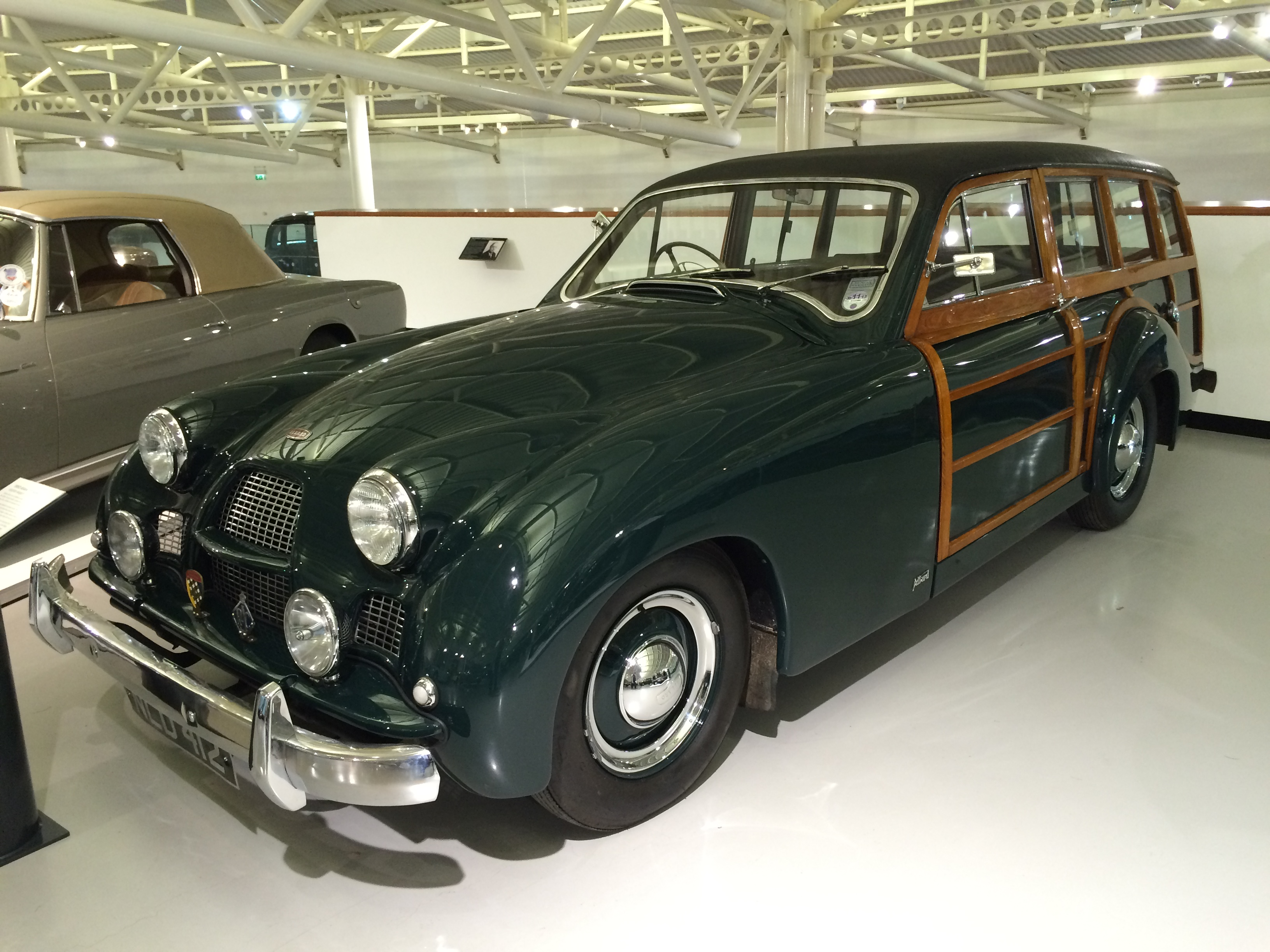
1953 P2 Safari

In an attempt to further extend its line, Allard adapted its P1 saloon to produce the 8-seater, wood-sided, V8-engined, P2 Safari Estate. It too found weak sales, with 13 examples being built in total.

=== M-types ===
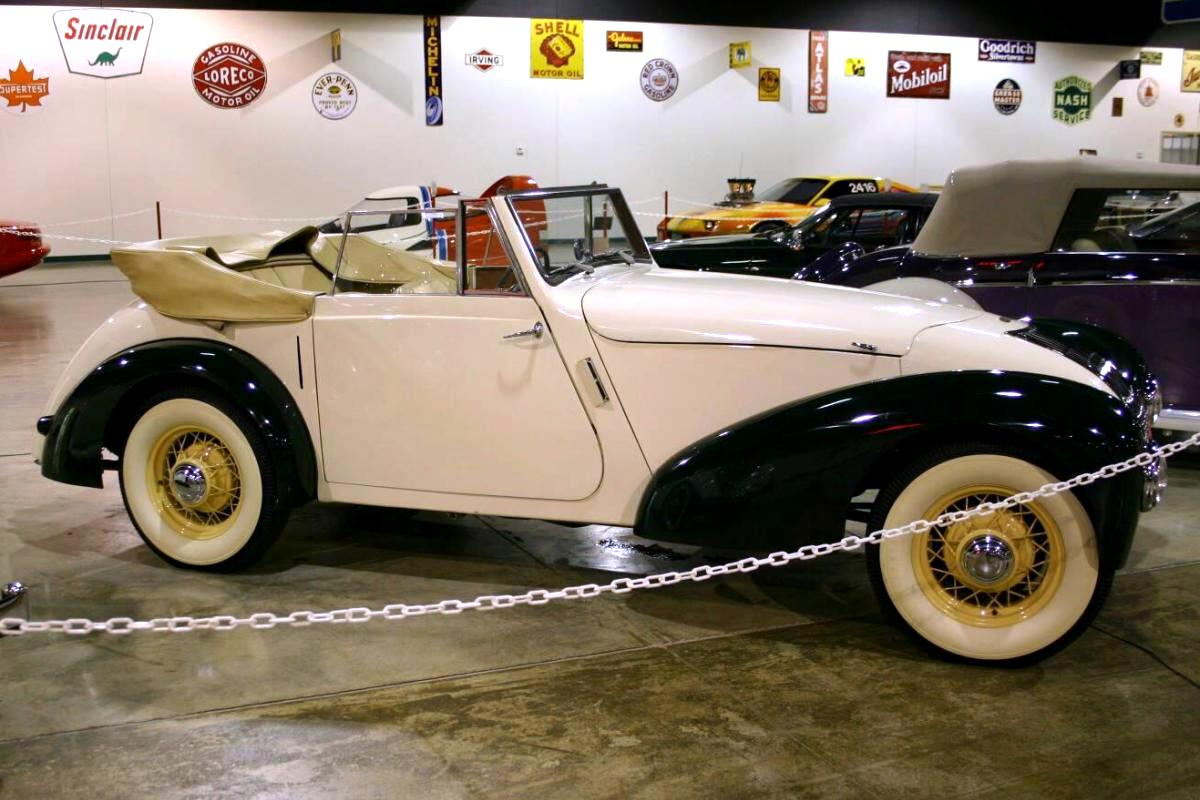
1949 M Drophead Coupé

The M appeared in 1948, remaining in production until 1950. It was a drophead coupé.

=== Clipper ===
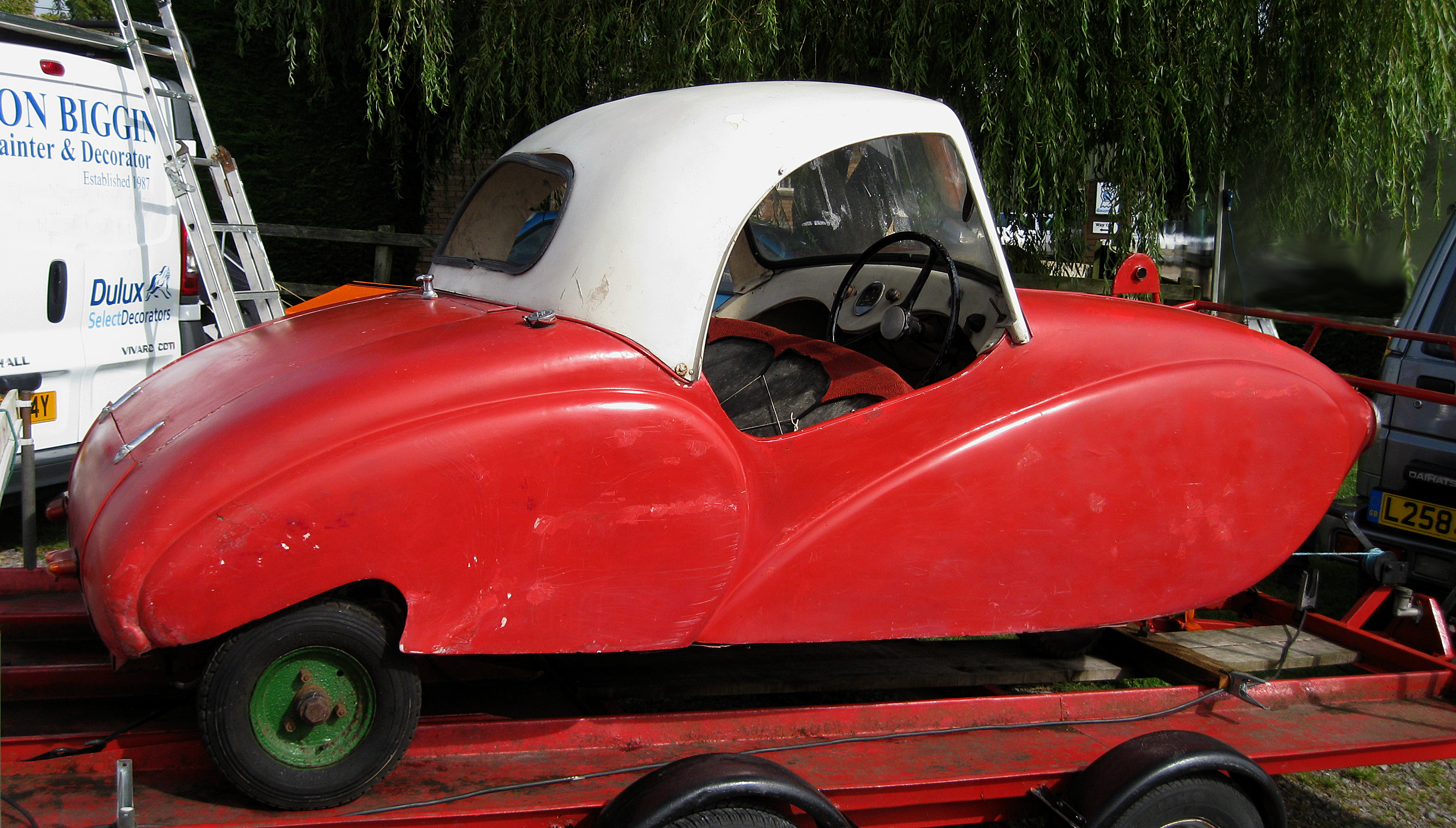
1954 Clipper

The 1953 Clipper was an attempt to cash in on the era's burgeoning microcar market. A tiny glass-fibre-bodied car powered by a rear-mounted 346 cc Villiers twin-cylinder motorcycle engine, it claimed to seat three people abreast with room for two children in an optional Dicky seat. About 20 were made.

=== Palm Beach ===
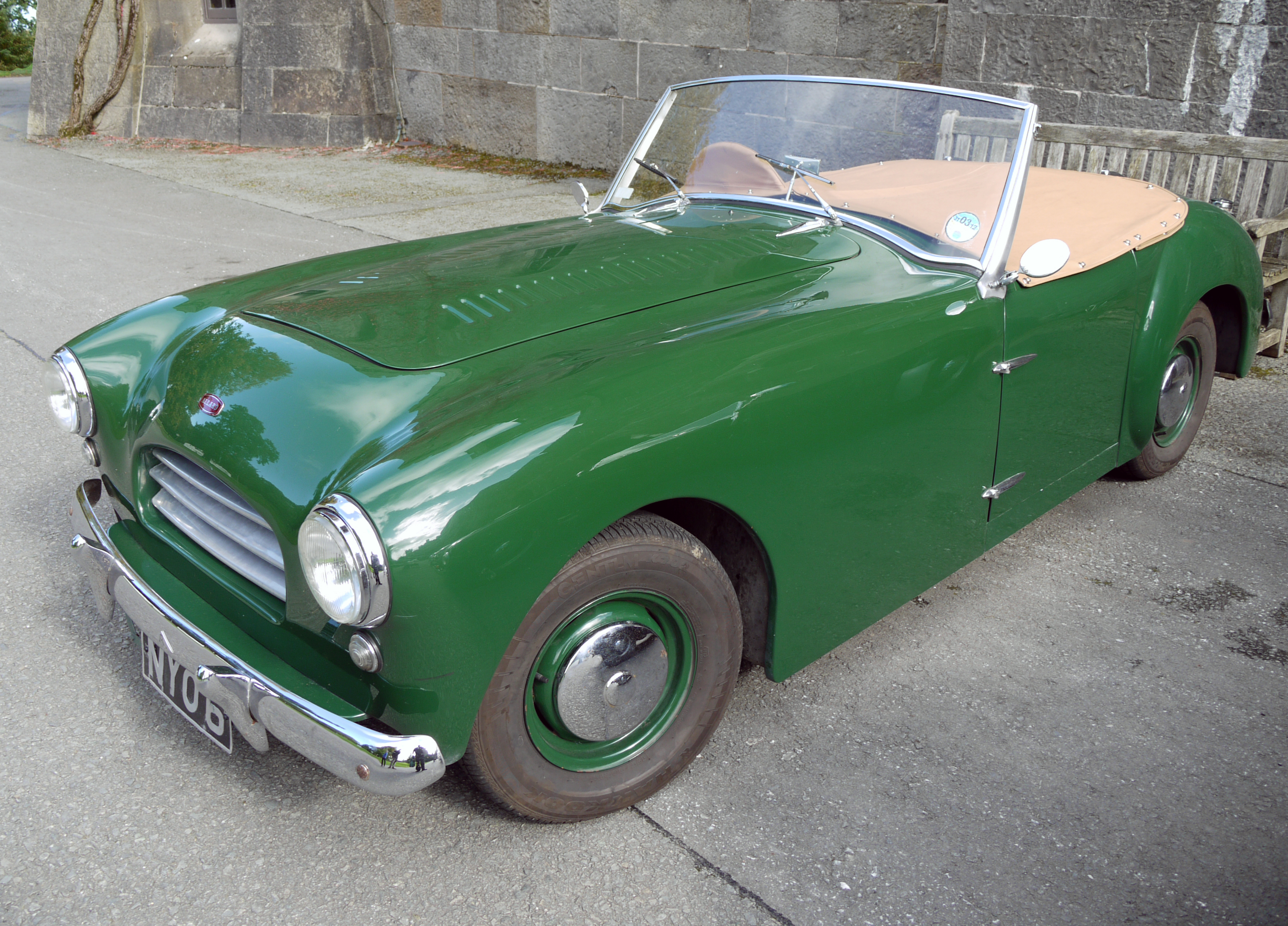
Palm Beach (1952–59)

Allard introduced the Palm Beach roadster in 1952. It had a 96 in (2,400 mm) wheelbase, it was powered by either a 1,508 cc (92.0 cu in) Ford Consul inline four or 2,622 cc (160.0 cu in) Ford Zephyr inline six. Priced under £1200, the MkI was built until 1958. It sold poorly. A Mark II was introduced in 1956, with more modern bodywork. It could be had with 2,553 cc (155.8 cu in) Zephyr or 3,442 cc (210.0 cu in) Jaguar XK120 inline six. The split front axle was replaced by torsion bars and coil springs were fitted in the back.

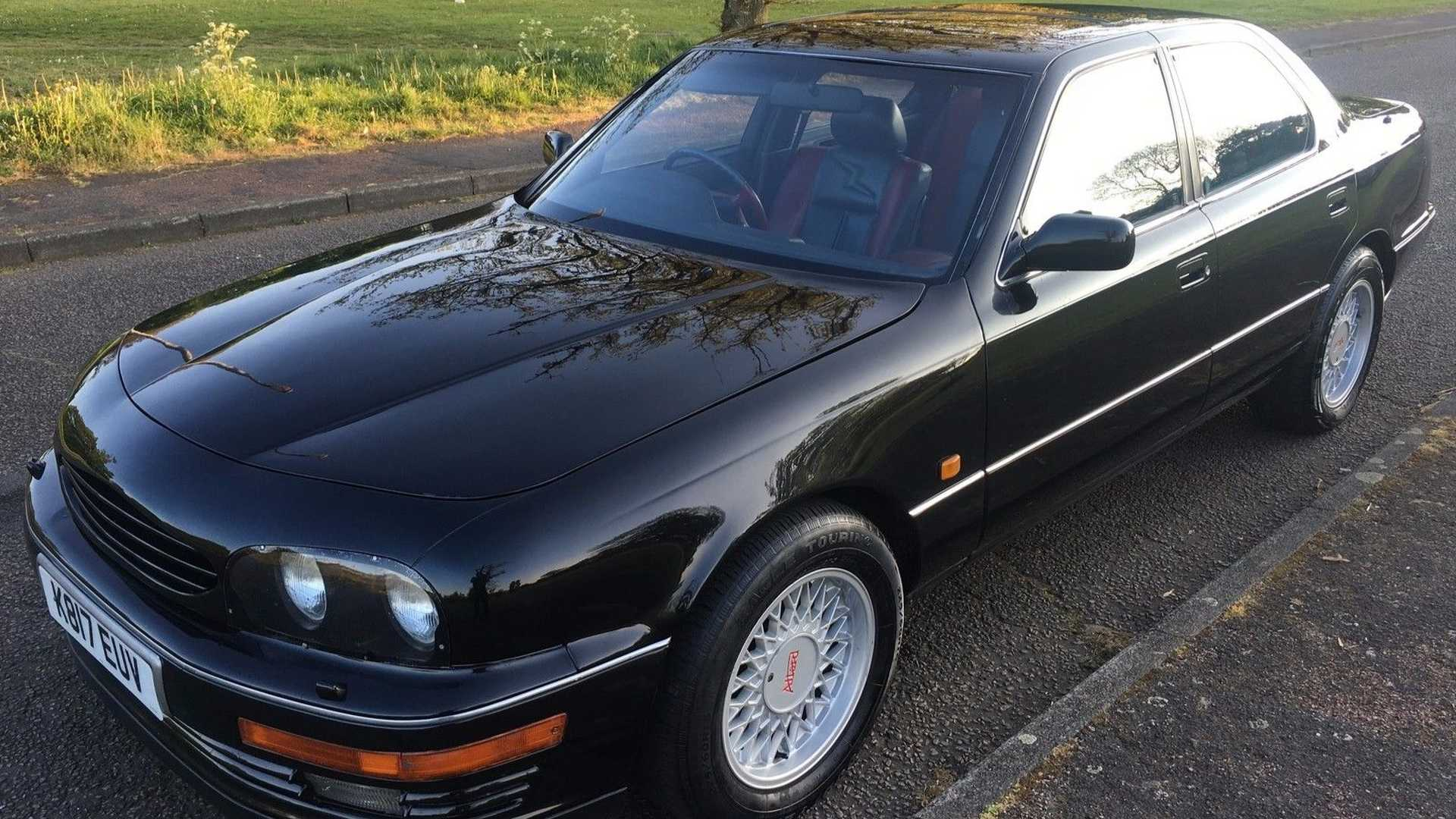
Allard P4

=== P4 ===
Car designer Chris Humberstone licensed the Allard name from Sydney's son Alan Allard in the 1990s. He developed the J2X-C prototype racer, powered by a 3.5 liter Cosworth V8 engine and a transmission also grafted from an F1 car.

Short of money, Humberstone allegedly attempted to work a deal with Toyota, which would have seen examples of the first-generation Lexus LS400 be rebadged and sold as Allards to help build attention and capital for the J2X-C racer. According to sources from the time, the deal between Allard and Toyota was allegedly proceeding well, but fizzled and ultimately fell flat for unknown reasons.

The Allard P4 follows the same formula as another re-styled Anglo-Japanese hybrid, the Sterling 825, with Allard handling the design aspects while Lexus covered all the performance essentials. That meant the P4 was powered by the LS400's 4.0 liter V8, which delivered 250 horsepower to the rear wheels. The exterior styling still retained a robust Lexus flavor. Still, Allard designers tried to make it somewhat different thanks to a revised front and rear fascia, basketweave wheels, and a red and black interior. The P4 did little to help the J2X-C program, which had collapsed after the car failed to meet its performance targets and the company itself liquidating during development.

== Decline ==
Insufficient research and development meant that Allard failed to keep up with cheaper and more technically advanced cars. The Palm Beach was essentially a year behind its competitors, the K3 failed to live up to expectations, and the Safari Estate could not find a market.

By the mid-1950s Allard was struggling to remain solvent, and with the market weak due to a late-1950s US recession, the company went into administration in 1957, when manufacture of cars came to an end.

The company also offered disc brake conversions for the Ford Anglia.

In 1961, the company offered a dragster, the Dragon, powered by a Shorrock-supercharged 1.5 liter Ford, and was distributor of the superchargers, later also taking over production of them.

Allard's son, Alan, marketed the Allardette 105, 109, and 116, using the straight-four-cylinder engine from the Ford Anglia and other Ford models.

In 1966 Sydney Allard died on the same night a fire destroyed the Clapham factory and some of the Allard Motor Company factory records. The factory site in Clapham, South West London, is now a development of social housing apartments, and the showroom and workshop in Putney is now a Howdens Joinery trade products showroom.

== Modern Revivals ==
Beginning in 1981, two Canadian enthusiasts in Ontario revived the J2X concept as the J2X2. Mel Stein and Arnold Korne, who owned the coachbuilding company A.H.A. Manufacturing Company Limited, characterized their effort as a revival rather than a recreation, although a number of changes were carried out compared to the original design. A second Canadian revival was started in 2009 by Roger P. Allard and his "Allard Motor Works", located in Montreal, Quebec. Their product was called the J2X MkII, while superficially similar to the original J2X, its glass-fibre body is dimensionally different and the chassis and drive-train are entirely different. Roger Allard and Allard Motor Works are not connected or related to the original Allard company or Sydney Allard in London England. The new J2X was offered with a variety of American V8 engines.

In 2012, a separate Allard company was established by Alan Allard in the UK, named Allard Sports Cars Limited. This company has also produced newer versions of the J2X, but based on the original models rather than the newer interpretations made by the Canadian Allard; as well as the J2X, they also make newer versions of the JR, and announced the development of a new J3 model in 2017. The company officially reopened its business and began production in September 2018.

== See also ==
- List of car manufacturers of the United Kingdom

== Bibliography ==
- Twite, Mike (1974). "Allard: Twenty Years Before his Time". In Ward, Ian (ed.). The World of Automobiles. Vol. 1. London: Orbis.
