= Allard Specials =

Sydney Herbert Allard (1910–1966) was the designer and manufacturer of a series of one-off competition cars produced between 1934 and 1939, the first of which was CLK 5. A total of twelve Specials were built before the outbreak of the Second World War; it is a measure of the esteem in which they were held that 9 of these can be listed individually below.

== Background ==
Allard had exhibited a keen interest in motor cars from a young age, and had taught himself how to drive by the age of sixteen. On completing his secondary education Sydney was found a job at F. W. Lucas Ltd., a garage and motor dealership, at first as a helper and then as a motor mechanic. He attended evening classes at Battersea Polytechnic and took a correspondence course in engineering, eventually becoming a member of the Institute of Automobile Engineers. Recognising his son's determination to pursue a career in motor engineering, Arthur Allard purchased a building in Keswick Road, Putney, and helped him to set up in business with Alf Brisco, who had been the head mechanic at F. W. Lucas.

Allard's first competitive motor race had been with his brother Dennis at Brooklands in 1929, driving a Grand Prix Morgan three-wheeler in a three-lap handicap race, which they won. He subsequently converted the Morgan to four wheels in an attempt to increase its stability, but ultimately its low ground clearance made it unsuitable for trialling, one of Allard's great interests. Adlards Motors, (Note: The building bought by Arthur Allard had belonged to a building and roofing company called Robert Adlard, and it was decided to retain the name Adlards, hence Adlards Motors. The new company occupied the ground floor and there was a block of flats above.'"`UNIQ--ref-00000004-QINU`"') as the new business was called, provided the workshop space to allow Allard to begin serious work on his competition specials. But Sydney's father disapproved of his son's competition activities, regarding them as a distraction from Adlard's regular garage work, so the specials sometimes had to be hidden from view under canvas at the back of the workshop.

Each of the Allard Specials is identified by its registration number. 9 of the 12 are described here.

== The cars ==
=== CLK 5 ===
CLK 5 taking part in the 1936 Land's End Trial

CLK 5 was the first of Allard's specials, built almost entirely from a damaged 1934 Model 40 Ford V8 except for the bodywork, which came from a two-seater Bugatti. The steering box and column, and the petrol tank, were also cannibalised from the Bugatti. With a ground clearance of more than 9 inches (23 cm) and plenty of low-speed torque from the 3.29-litre (201 cu in) Ford flathead V8 engine, CLK 5 was ideally suited for its role as a trials machine.

So successful was CLK 5 that two more similar Allards were built.

=== FGP 750 ===
FGP 750 was the first of the two CLK 5 copies. Like its sister car, it had the same – although slightly elongated – imitation Bugatti-type tail as CLK 5, and was fitted with Ford steel disc wheels. The car's chassis was drilled to reduce weight.

=== Others ===
There followed three V8-engined 2/4 seater bodied cars with flat (rather than vee-shaped) radiator grilles:

AUX 59 (with Ford wheels);

EXX 455 (Ford wheels);

EXP 469 (Wire wheels/ rudge hubs).

FXP 470 Lincoln Zephyr V12, with a flat radiator grille; this car subsequently formed the basis for the Parker Special.

EXP 470 Lincoln Zephyr V12.

ELL 300 Similar but with the V8 engine (described as the second special (after CLK5) by one source).

LMG 192 with V12 engine, unfinished at the start of war.
