= Allard P1 =

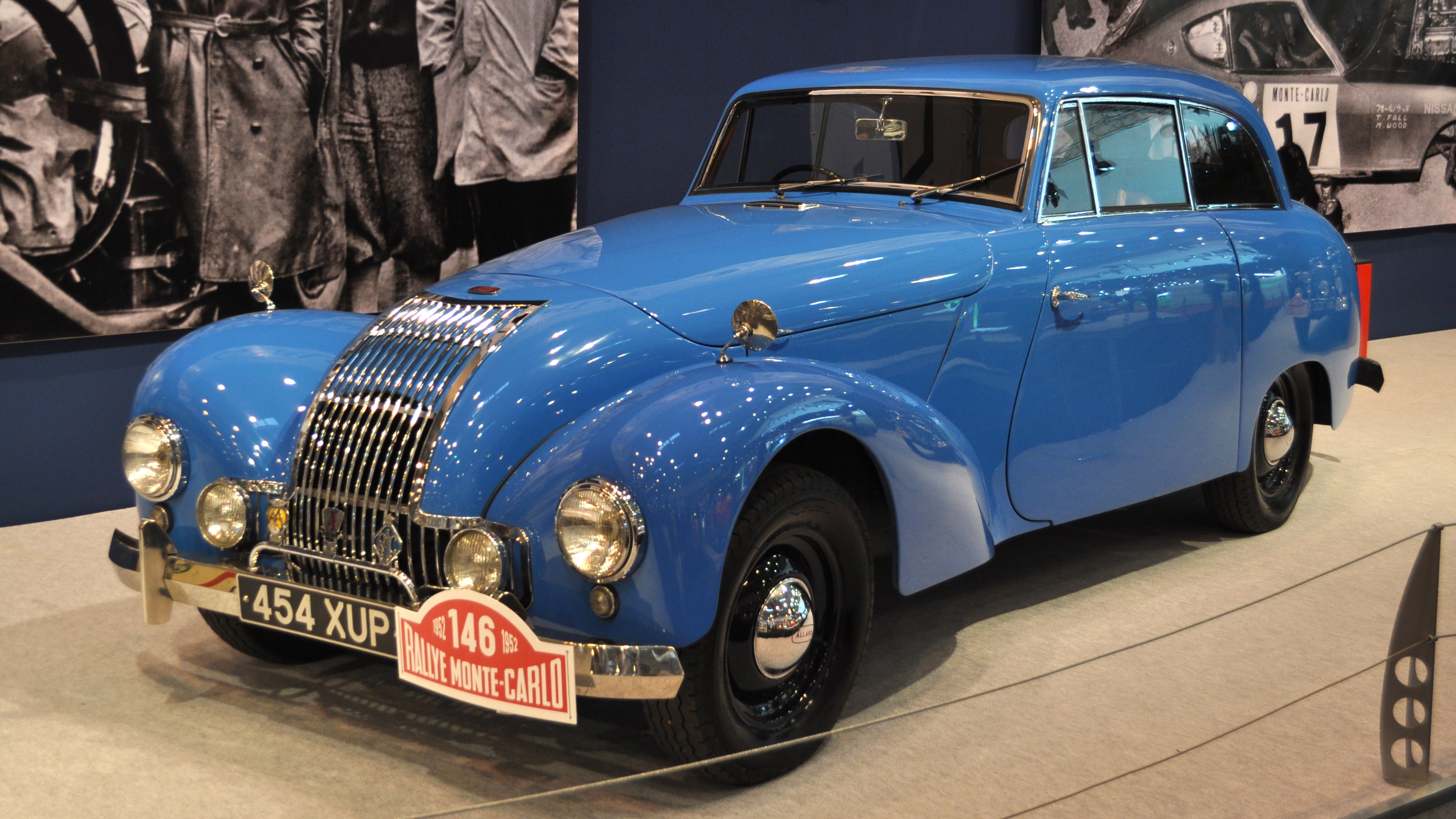

Overview
- Manufacturer: Allard Motor Company
- Production: 1949 - 1952; 559 built

Body and chassis
- Body style: 2-door saloon
- Related: Allard M

Powertrain
- Engine: 3622 cc Ford 221 SV V8; 4375 cc Mercury SV V8
- Transmission: 3-speed manual

Dimensions
- Length: 186 in (4,724 mm)
- Width: 71 in (1,803 mm)
- Height: 60 in (1,524 mm)

Chronology
- Predecessor: none
- Successor: Allard P2

The Allard P1 (known when new more often than not simply as the Allard 3.6-litre Saloon) is a five-seater two-door sports saloon produced by the British Allard Motor Company between 1949 and 1952. 559 Allard P1s were built.

The cars used Ford engines and transmissions. This helped reduce problems finding service support and parts for cars exported to the US which was a key export market for Allard and other UK makers of larger cars in the 1950s.

A car tested by the British magazine The Autocar in 1949 recorded a top speed of 84.5 mph (136.0 km/h) and could accelerate from 0–60 mph (97 km/h) in 23.4 seconds. A fuel consumption of 17 miles per imperial gallon (17 L/100 km; 14 mpg_{‑US}) was recorded. The test car cost £1277 including taxes. The Competition Series version received Mercury's 4.4 litre V8 engine with 115 hp (86 kW); if this did not suffice then various aftermarket parts from companies such as Edelbrock or Edmunds could be specified.

Unusually in a car of post-war design, the Allard featured a windscreen hinged at the top, which could be opened "by means of a central toggle mechanism". Interior fittings displayed unusual attention to detail by the car's designers, with good interior storage including a packages shelf under the fascia and "pockets formed...in the thickness of the doors". Instrumentation included, in addition to a choke control, a "screw-type hand throttle" as well as a switch for a light in the engine compartment.

A heater that drew fresh air from the outside was included as a standard feature on exported cars, and was offered as an optional extra for the domestic market.

In 1952 an Allard P1, driven by Sydney Allard himself, along with Guy Warburton, won the Monte Carlo Rally. Tom Lush was the navigator.

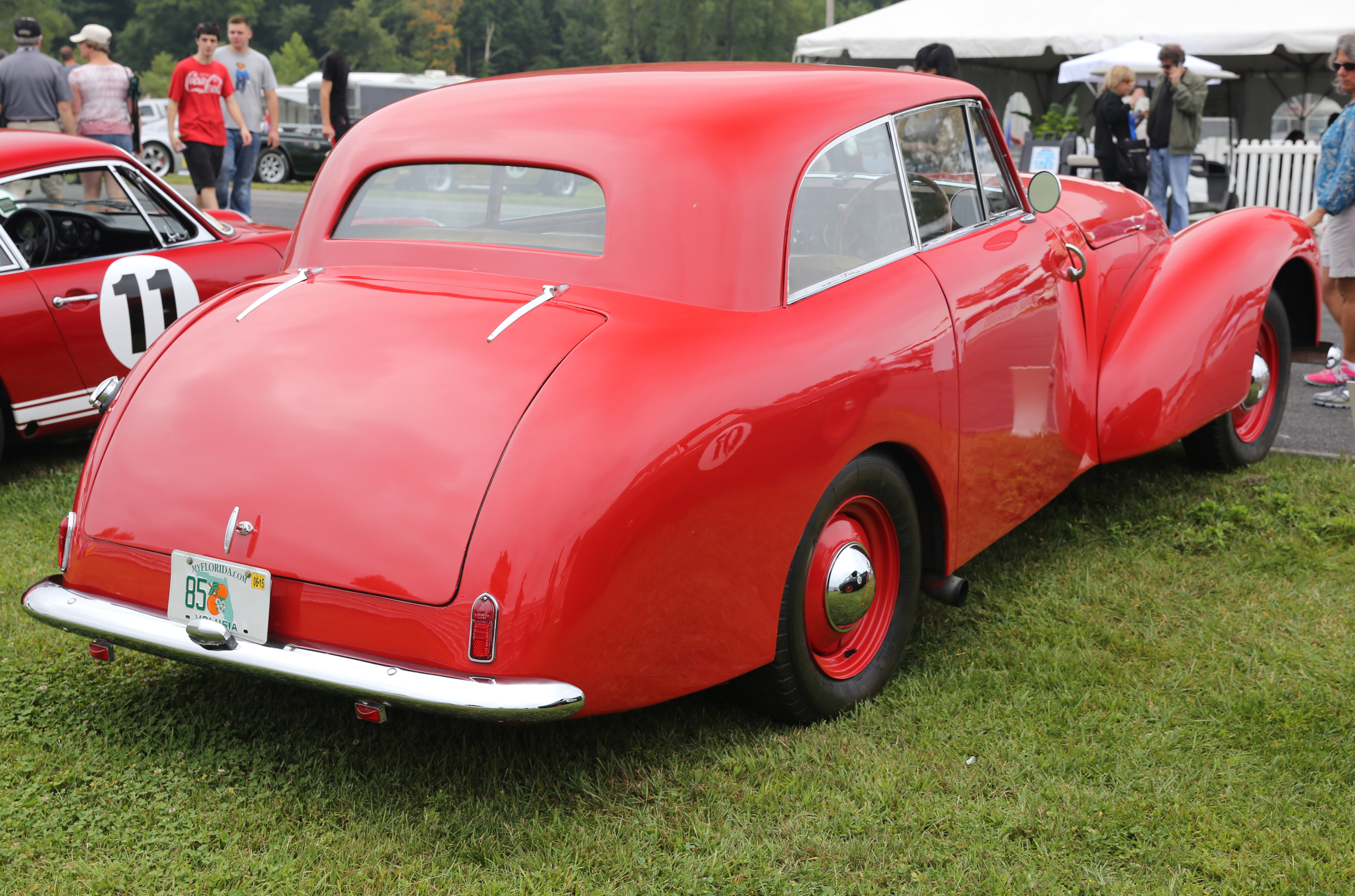
1951 Allard P1, rear view
