= Williams & Pritchard =

Car part manufacturer

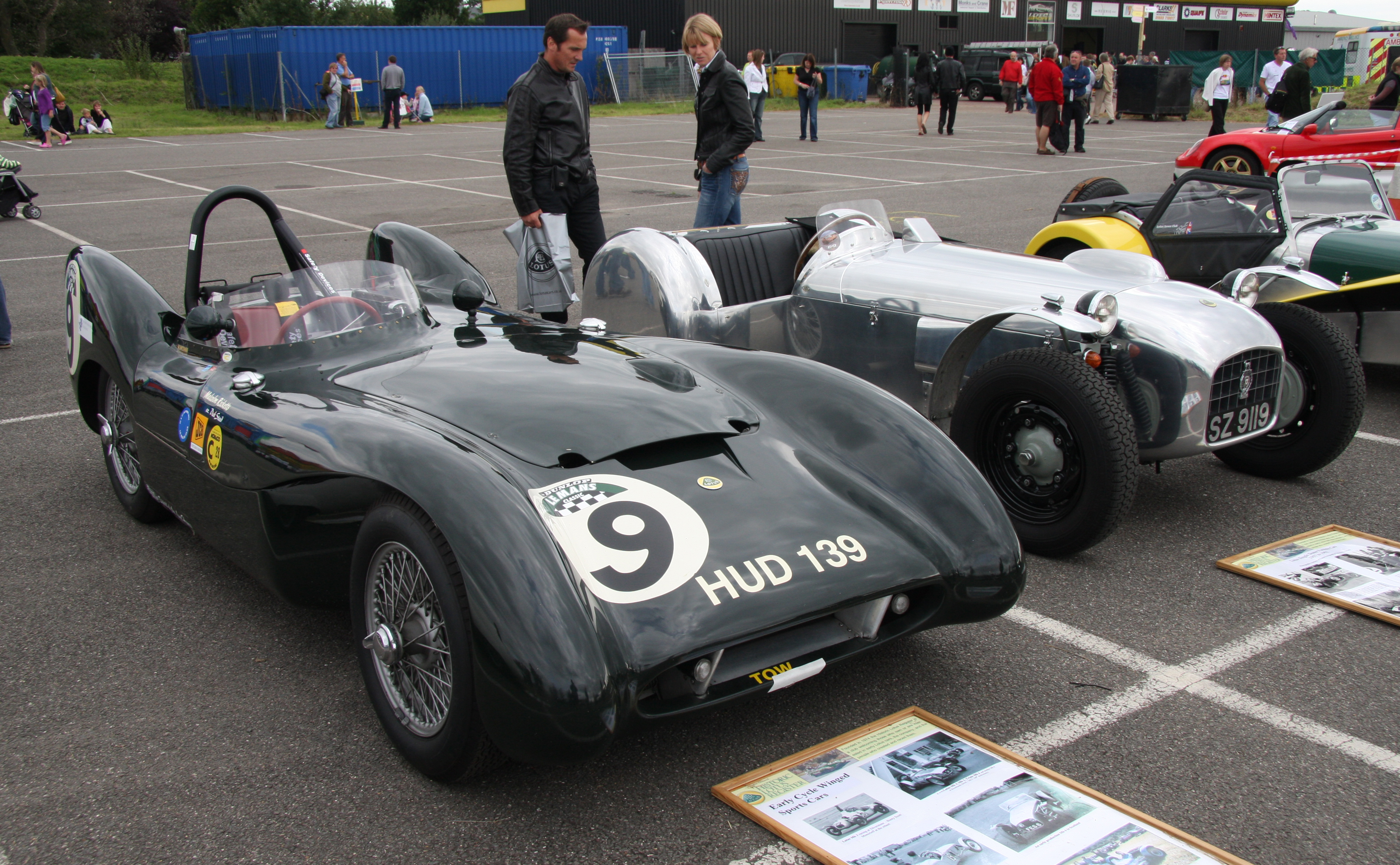
Lotus Mark IX beside a Lotus Mark VI

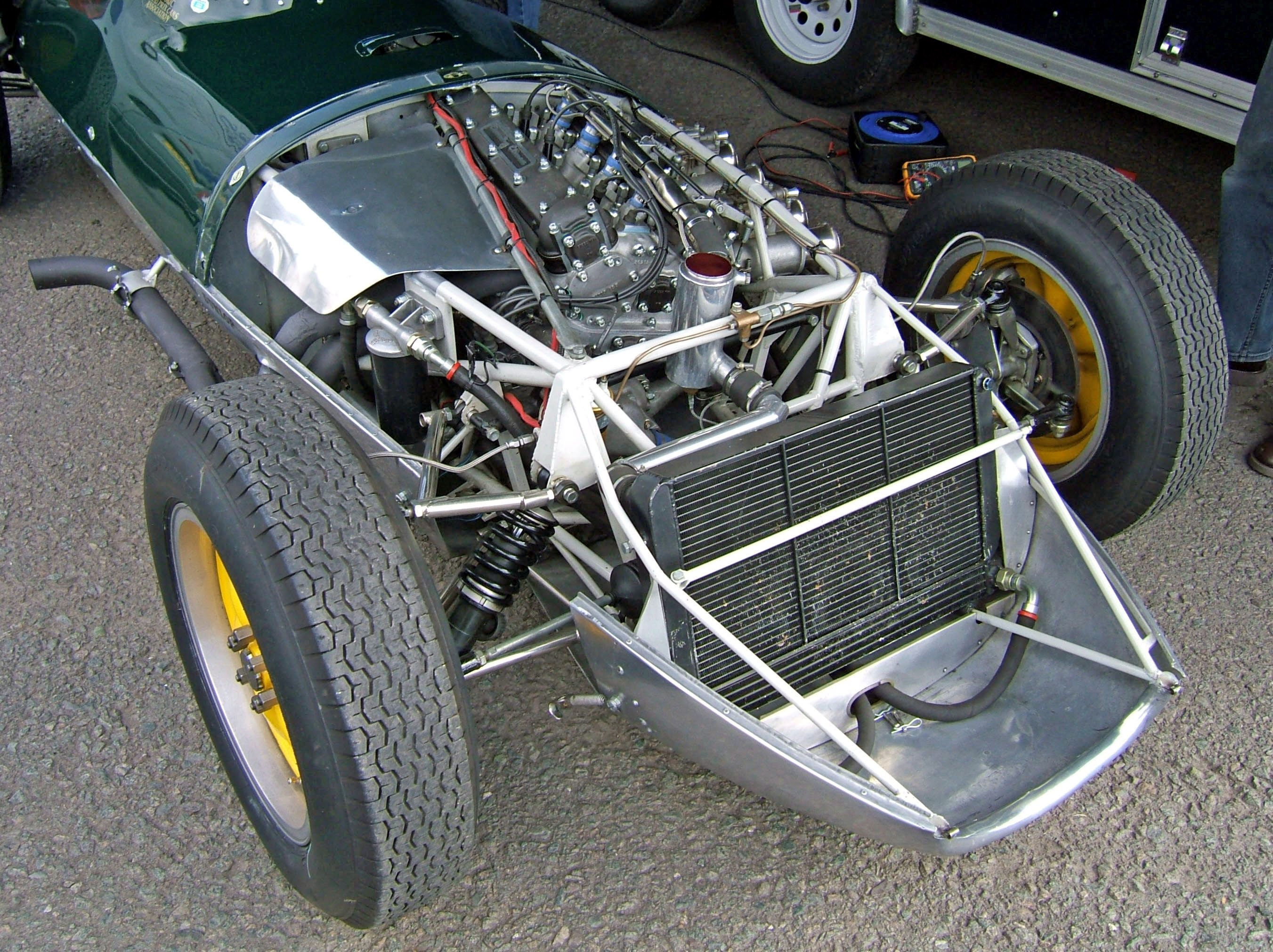
Lotus 16 shaped by Charlie Williams not Frank Costin

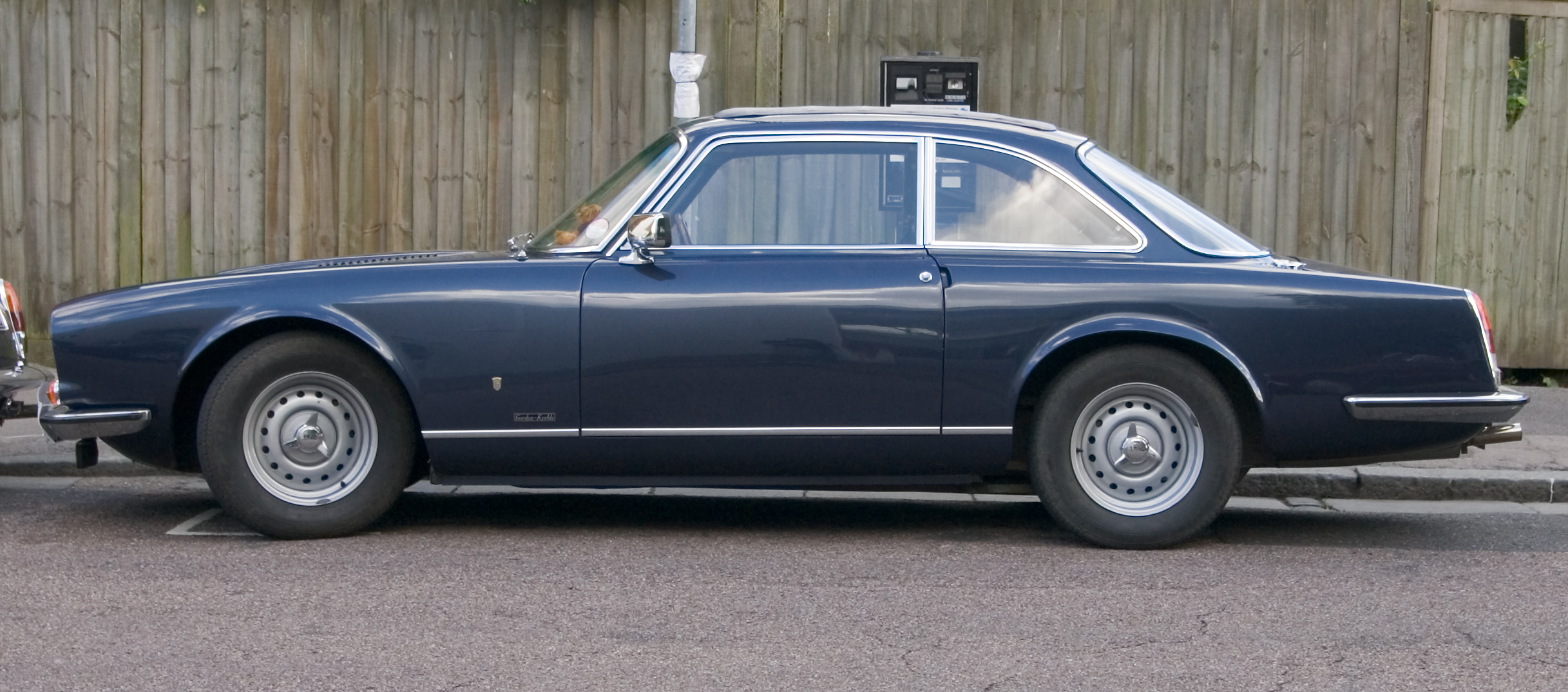
Gordon-Keeble

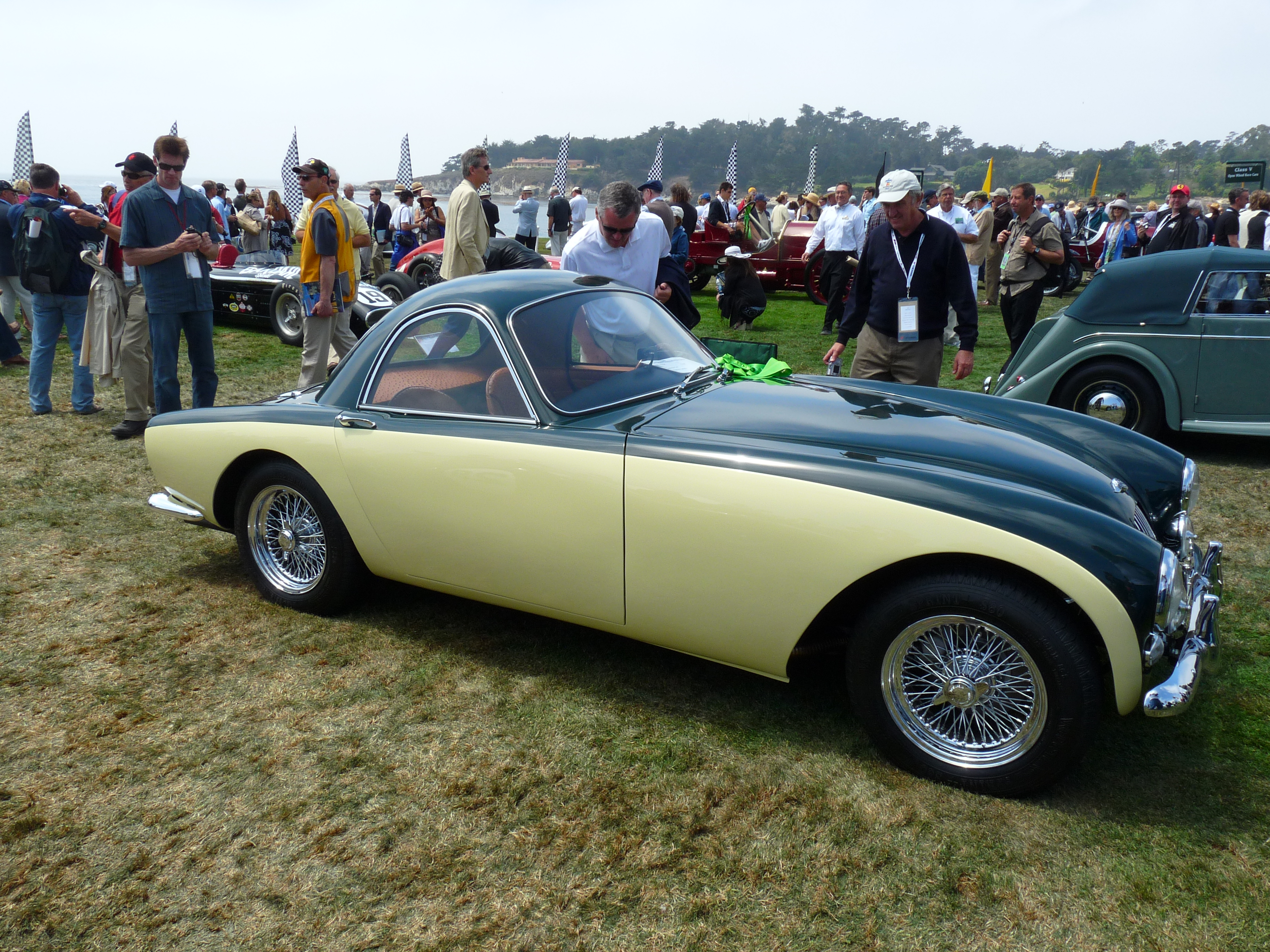
Morgan Plus Four Plus SLR coupé 1965

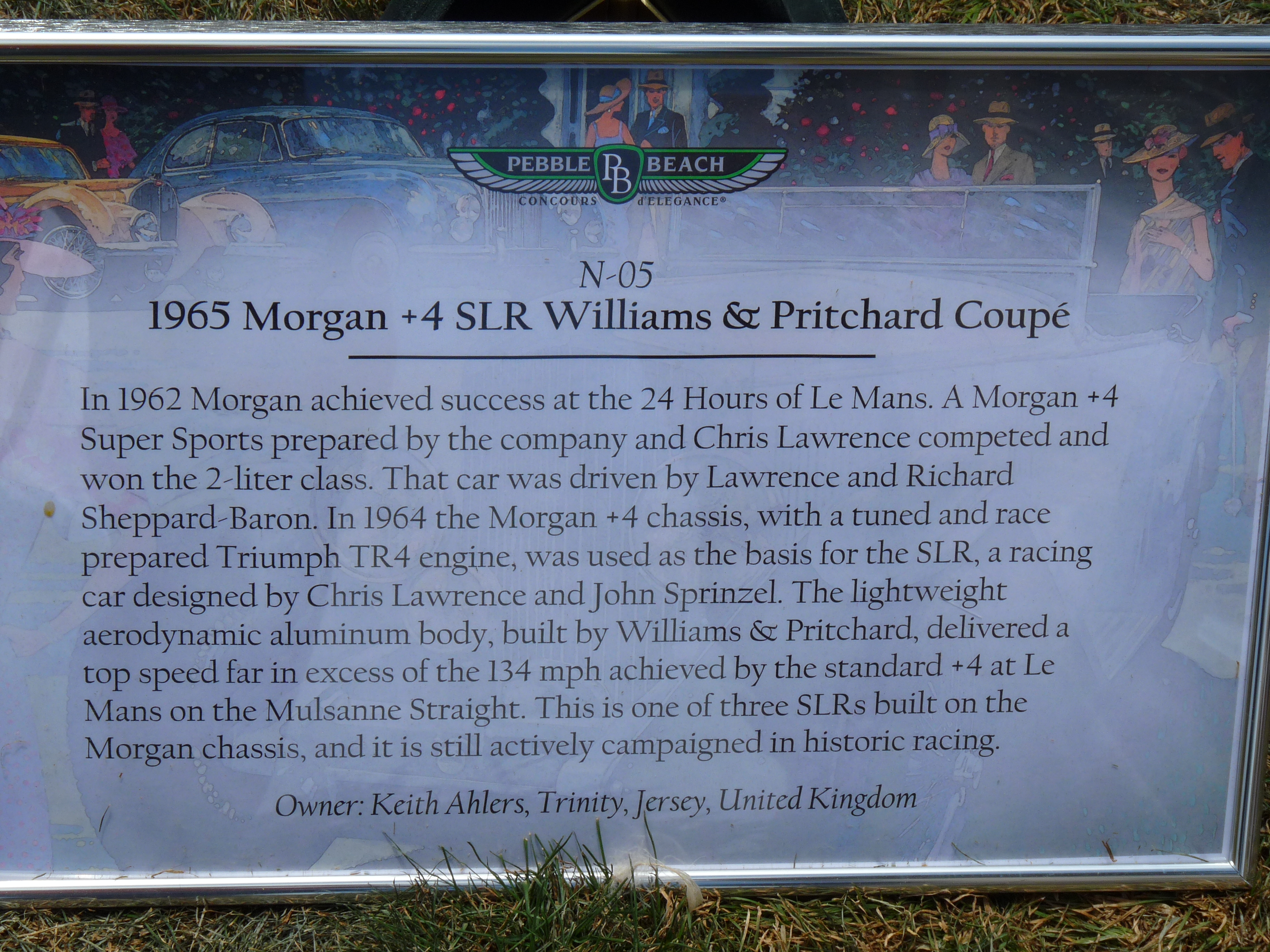
Morgan Plus Four Plus SLR coupé 1965

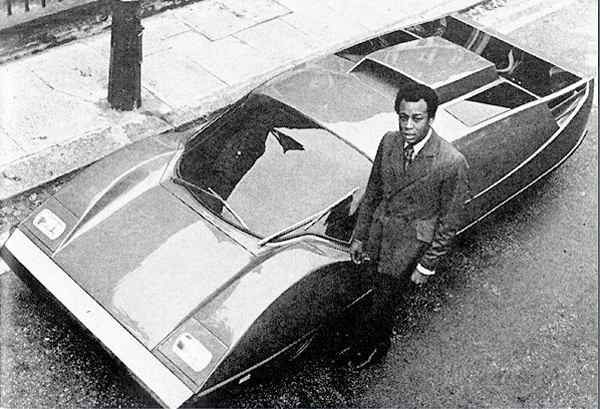
Ikenga MK ll 1968

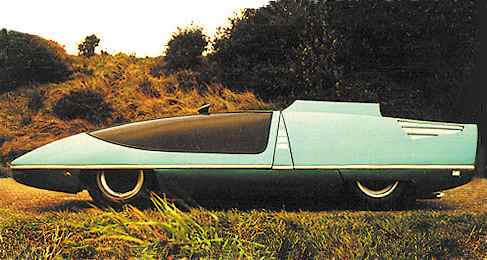
Ikenga MK lll - 69

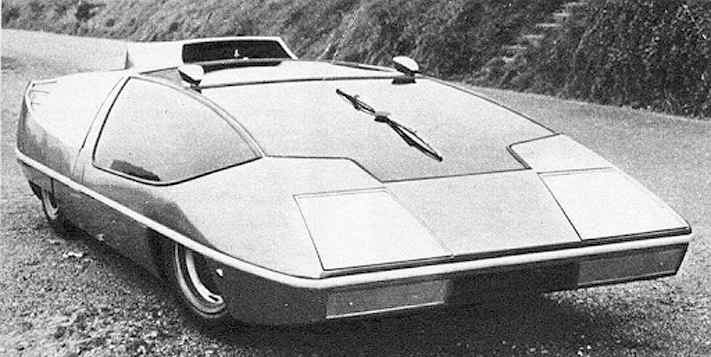
Ikenga MK III 1969

Williams & Pritchard Limited was a small coachbuilding business operating from First Avenue, Edmonton, London N18 which made lightweight sports and racing car bodies as well as runs of cars for small manufacturers fabricated using aluminium or composite construction or moulded fibre-glass.

== Start ==
The business was founded in the late 1940s by Charlie Williams (1915-1969) from Corsica Coachworks and Len Pritchard (1919-2008) whose coachbuilding careers had been diverted by the war to building Spitfire aircraft. They began in Edmonton then worked from Hornsey with an extra workshop in Hammersmith before returning permanently to Edmonton.

== Clients ==
The clients of Williams & Pritchard included: Colin Chapman, Lotus, AC (Aceca coupé), Lola, Cooper, Lister-Jaguar, Elva, John Surtees, Costin, Gordon-Keeble, BRM, John Sprinzel, Speedwell.

In the early days of Lotus, Williams & Pritchard employed about two dozen men and put through production runs that took about three weeks to build a car. Williams & Pritchard was to build every Lotus prototype up to and including the Elan. The close relationship with Lotus ended in 1962 after Lotus set up their own body shop.

Moulds for glass fibre bodies were made from bodies first made and finished in aluminium, but the first Lister-Jaguar was made by shaping a chicken wire armature on the actual chassis.

When the original 1961 Gordon-Keeble project was revived in 1964, a new prototype incorporating improvements over the Bertone version was made in alloy in order to build a mould. Production was planned to be at Eastleigh near Southampton. Williams & Pritchard set up their own facility at Eastleigh employing around 20 extra people there, and another at Edmonton. The partners alternated between the sites. Eventually Keeble's revived project fell apart and it became an expensive experience for Williams and Pritchard.

The last coachbuilding client of Williams & Pritchard was designer David Gittens' McLaren-based Ikenga GT prototypes, the last of which was completed following Charlie Williams death in June 1969.

Another project carried out in the 1970s was the rare Owen Sedanca GT, an original sports car that appeared briefly with a 4.2-litre Jaguar XK engine from a Jaguar XJ6 car and an aluminium bodyshell. Of a planned 80 cars that were to be made, only ten were reportedly completed at their W & S LIMITED Edmonton North London workshops.

After the sudden death of Charlie Williams in 1969, the fibre-glass section was closed and the business deliberately shrunk to about half a dozen employees building metal prototypes and occasionally restoring famous postwar racing cars. Williams & Pritchard closed in 1986. The rights to the company name have been the subject of various claims in recent years. In 2010, the name 'Williams & Pritchard Ltd' and the design of the ID plate fixed in period to cars bearing W&P coachwork was registered as a UK Trade Mark.

== After-market ==
Williams & Pritchard provided detachable glass fibre hardtops for all contemporary sports cars and replacement front-ends (bonnet and mudguards sections), particularly for Austin-Healey Sprites. They were first launched at the 1961 Racing Car Show.
