= Lotus Mark IX =

Aluminium-bodied sports racing car

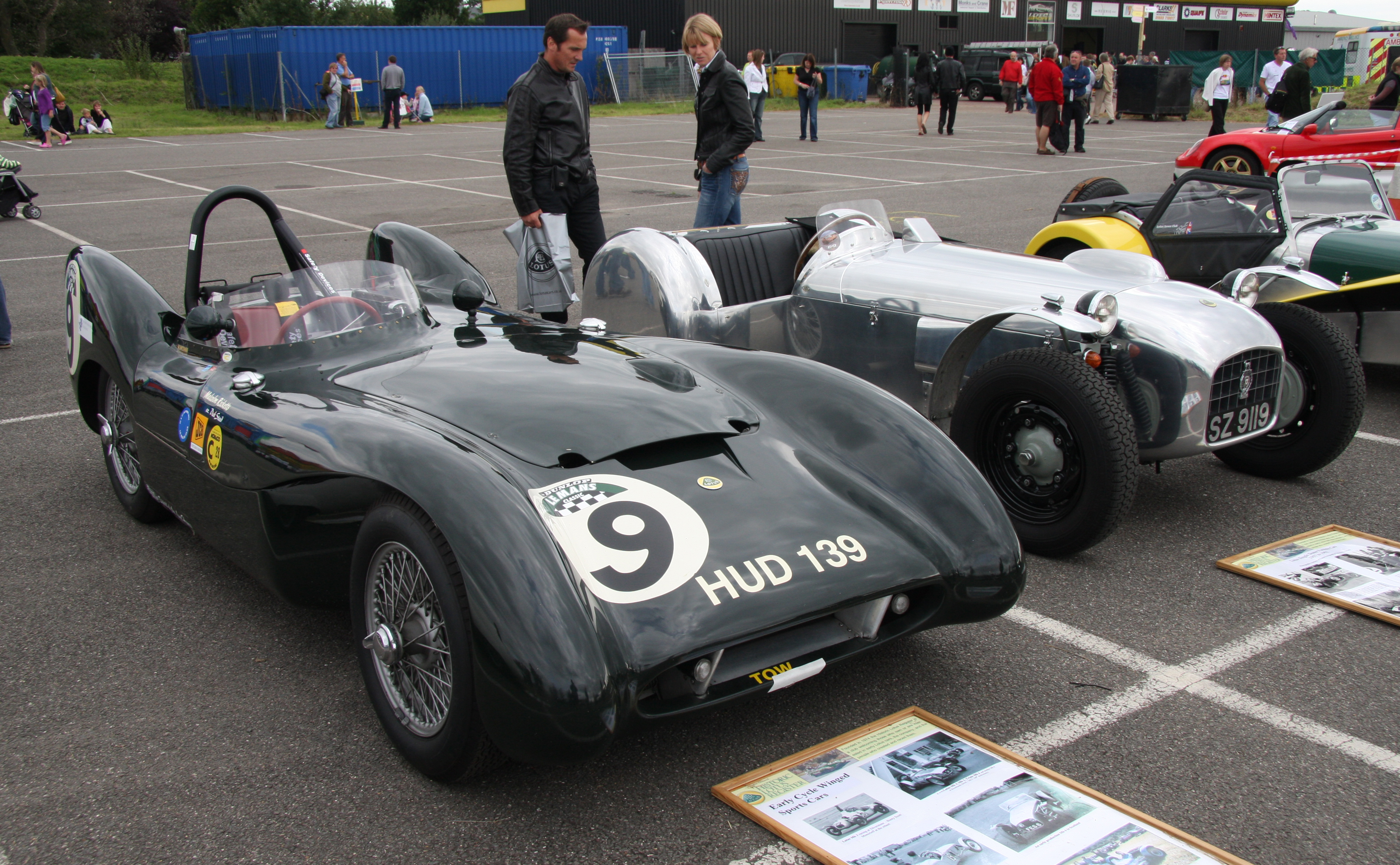
- 1954 Lotus Mark IX, Coventry Climax 1098 cc beside a Lotus Mark VI

Overview
- Manufacturer: Lotus Cars
- Production: 1954–1955
- Designer: Colin Chapman

Body and chassis
- Class: Sports racing car
- Body style: Roadster
- Layout: Front engine, rear drive
- Platform: Tubular space frame
- Related: Lotus Mark VI

Powertrain
- Engine: Coventry Climax 1098 cc
- Transmission: Manual 4-speed (MGTF)

Dimensions
- Wheelbase: 7 feet 3.5 inches (2.22 m)
- Length: 11 feet 7.5 inches (3.54 m)
- Width: 4 feet 8 inches (1.42 m)
- Height: 2 feet 3 inches (0.69 m)
- Curb weight: 1,080 pounds (490 kg)

Chronology
- Predecessor: Lotus Mark VIII
- Successor: Lotus Eleven

The Lotus Mark IX (1955) was an aluminium-bodied sports racing car manufactured by Lotus Engineering Ltd. About thirty of the Mark IX sports racing cars were made. It was closely related to the Lotus model Mark VIII (1954), of which only about seven cars were made. These cars were largely based on the innovative space frame of the Lotus Mark VI (1952). The highly aerodynamic bodies were designed by Frank Costin and constructed by Williams & Pritchard Limited.

During this early era, of 1954–1955, Lotus Engineering was still a fledgling company, and cars were delivered in different states of completion on special orders. Similar to the Mark VIII, the Mark IX was available in various configurations and different engines, including the 1500 cc MG, 1500 cc Connaught and 2-litre Bristol engines fitted. However, the Mark IX designation is most often powered by the 1100 cc Coventry Climax engine. Apparently, two models of Mark IX were offered – the "Club" and the "Le Mans", the latter of which had larger drum brakes fitted.

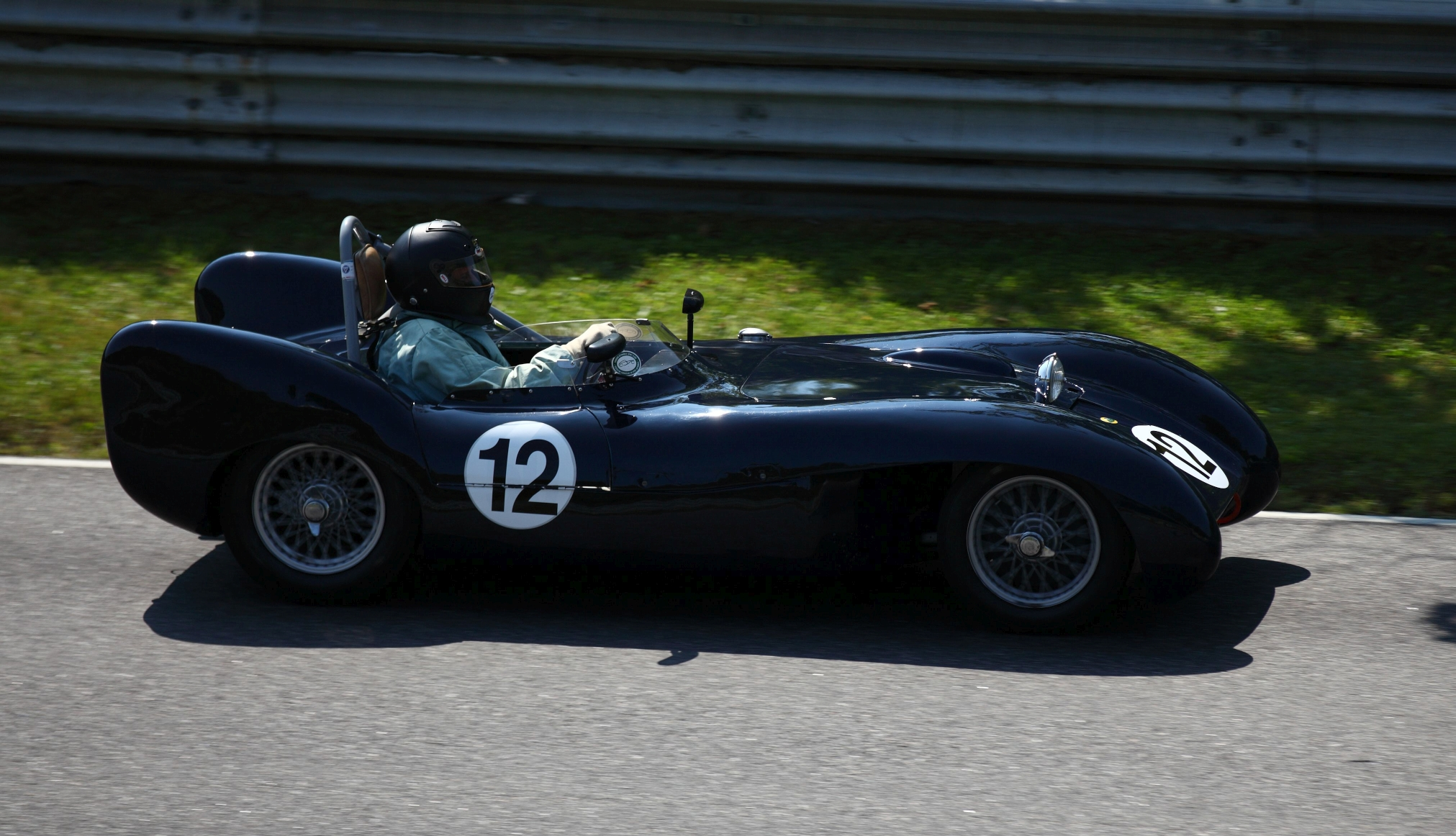
Lotus IX at a modern vintage race

The chassis of the Mark IX was a new design, compared to that of the Mark VIII. Both were space frames of brazed steel tube. The new chassis was an advance over the Mark VIII in terms of the efficiency of its design and avoiding the VIII's need for diaphragm-stiffening panels. However, both chassis still used an oversized lower rail of 1.8-inch (5 cm) tube, a hang-over from the original design of the first Mark VI space frame. Compared to the Mark VIII, the Mark IX was shortened somewhat to a wheelbase of 7 feet 3.5 inches (2.22 m), and the body itself was about two feet (0.6 m) shorter than that of the Mark VIII. This was so that Colin Chapman could fit it on his transporter.

A total of about thirty of the Mark IX sports racing cars were produced in various forms, and these were successfully raced in both Europe and the US. The first two examples of the Mark IX were apparently delivered to the US with the 1100 cc Coventry Climax engine to compete in the 1955 running of the 12 Hours of Sebring race and were beaten by a Porsche Spyder. These cars were actually entered as Lotus Mark VIII models in the G class by Frank Miller of Larchmont, NY and by Bobby Burns and Norman J. Scott of Houston TX in, respectively, car numbers 78 and 79. The Lotus Works Team entered two Mark IXs in the Le Mans 24 hour race in 1955. But Chapman's IX was the only car to start. His car was essentially a prototype for the Eleven. It was equipped with disc brakes and other advanced features. However, the car was disqualified due to his reversing the car to re-enter the race track without the assistance of track marshalls after going off course.
