= Gordon-Keeble =

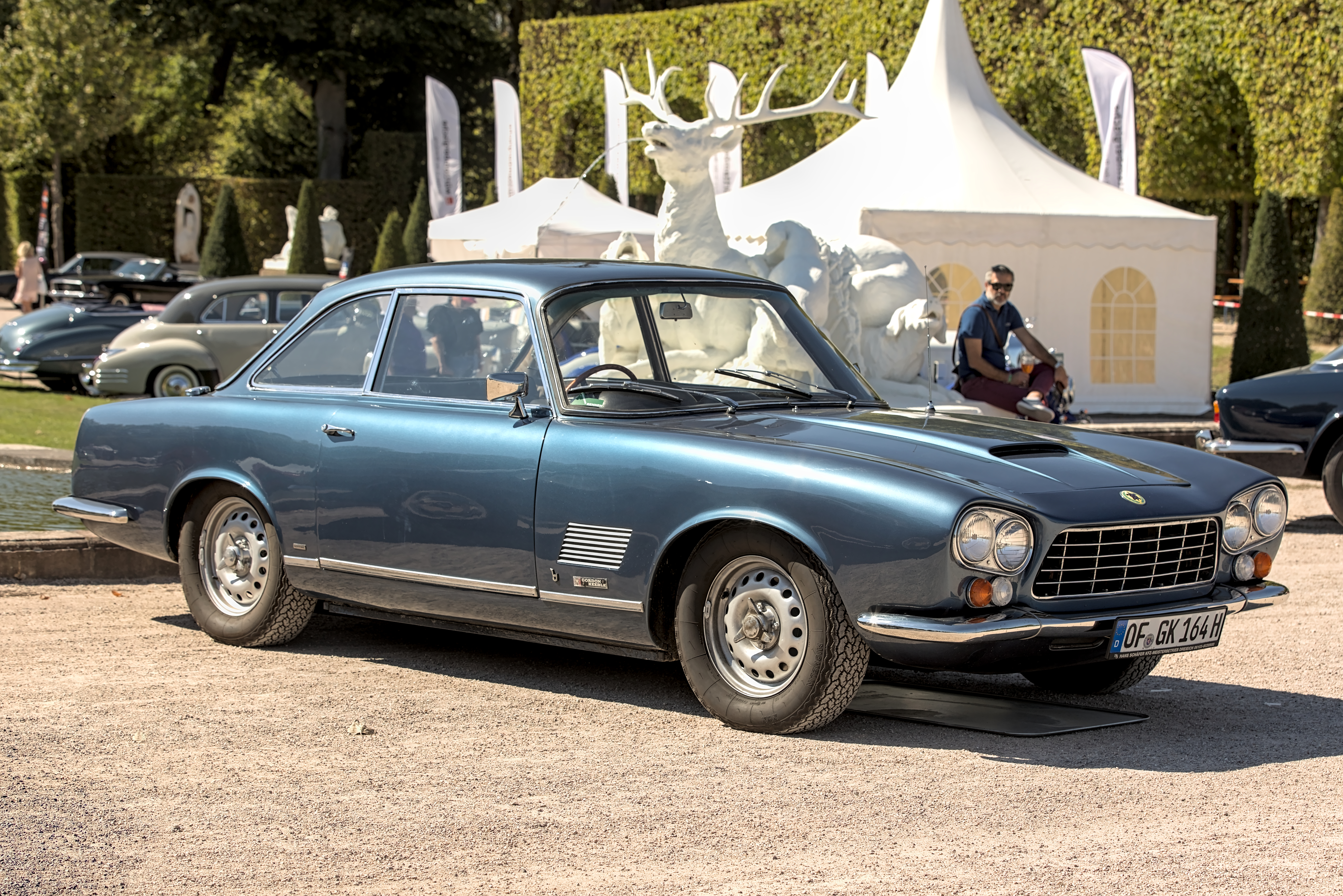

Overview
- Manufacturer: Gordon-Keeble
- Production: 1964–1967; 100 produced
- Designer: Giorgetto Giugiaro at Bertone

Body and chassis
- Class: Grand tourer
- Body style: 2-door saloon
- Layout: Front-engine, rear-wheel-drive

Powertrain
- Engine: 5.4 Chevrolet 327 V8
- Transmission: 4-speed manual

Dimensions
- Wheelbase: 102 in (2,591 mm)
- Length: 184 in (4,674 mm)
- Width: 68 in (1,727 mm)

Gordon-Keeble was a British car marque, conceived in Slough, then constructed in Eastleigh, and finally in Southampton (all in England), between 1964 and 1967. The marque's badge was unusual in featuring a tortoise — a pet tortoise walked into the frame of an inaugural photo-shoot, taken in the grounds of the makers. Because of the irony (the slowness of tortoises), the animal was chosen as the emblem.

== Design ==
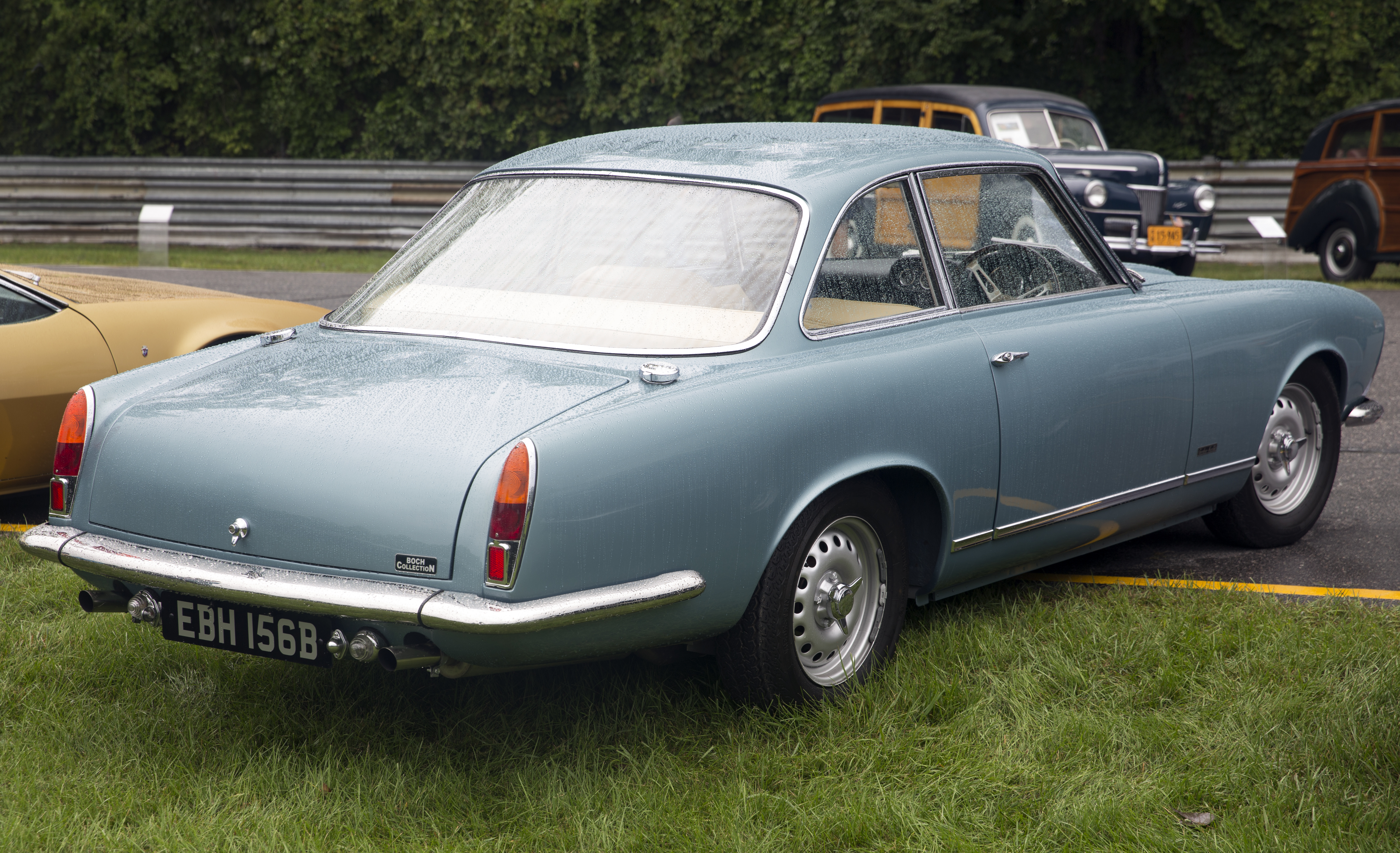
1964 Gordon-Keeble GK1 rear 3/4 view

The Gordon-Keeble came about when John Gordon (formerly of the struggling Peerless company) and Jim Keeble got together in 1959 to make the Gordon GT car – initially by fitting a Chevrolet Corvette V8 engine into a chassis by Peerless – for a USAF pilot named Nielsen. The concept proved impressive, and subsequently a 4.6 litre Chevrolet (283 c.i.) V8 was fitted into a specially designed square-tube steel spaceframe chassis, with independent front suspension and all-round disc brakes. The complete chassis was then taken to Turin, Italy, where Bertone built a body made of steel panels, designed by Giorgetto Giugiaro. The car's four five-inch headlights featured the rare, slightly angled "slanted" arrangement also used for a few other European marques, generally for high-speed cars such as Lagonda Rapide, Lancia Flaminia and Triumphs, as well as for Rolls-Royce. The interior featured white-on-black gauges, toggle switches, and quilted aircraft PVC.

The car appeared on the Bertone stand at the Geneva Motor Show in March 1960, branded simply as a Gordon. At that time problems with component deliveries had delayed construction of the prototype, which had accordingly been built at breakneck speed by Gruppo Bertone in precisely 27 days. After extensive road-testing the car was shipped to Detroit and shown to Chevrolet management, who agreed to supply Corvette engines and gearboxes for a production run of the car.

== Production ==
The car was readied for production with some alterations, principally a larger 5.4-litre (327 c.i.) 300 hp (224 kW; 304 PS) Chevrolet V8 engine and a change from steel to a glass fibre body initially made by Williams & Pritchard Limited and later in-house. Problems with suppliers occurred, and before many cars were made the money ran out and the original Gordon-Keeble Automobile Company Ltd went into liquidation. About 90 cars had been sold at what turned out to be an unrealistic low price of £2798, £1400 lower than an Aston Martin or half the price of the cheapest Ferrari. Each car had two petrol tanks.

In 1965, Harold Smith and Geoffrey West bought the company and re-registered it as Keeble Cars Ltd. Production resumed, but only for a short time, the last car of the main manufacturing run being made in 1966. A final example was actually produced in 1967 from spares, bringing the total made to exactly 100. The Gordon-Keeble Owners' Club claim that over 90 examples still exist.

An attempt was made to restart production in 1968 when an American, John de Bruyne, bought the rights to the car, but this came to nothing, although two cars badged "De Bruyne" were shown at that year's New York Motor Show along with a new mid-engined coupé.

== Gallery ==
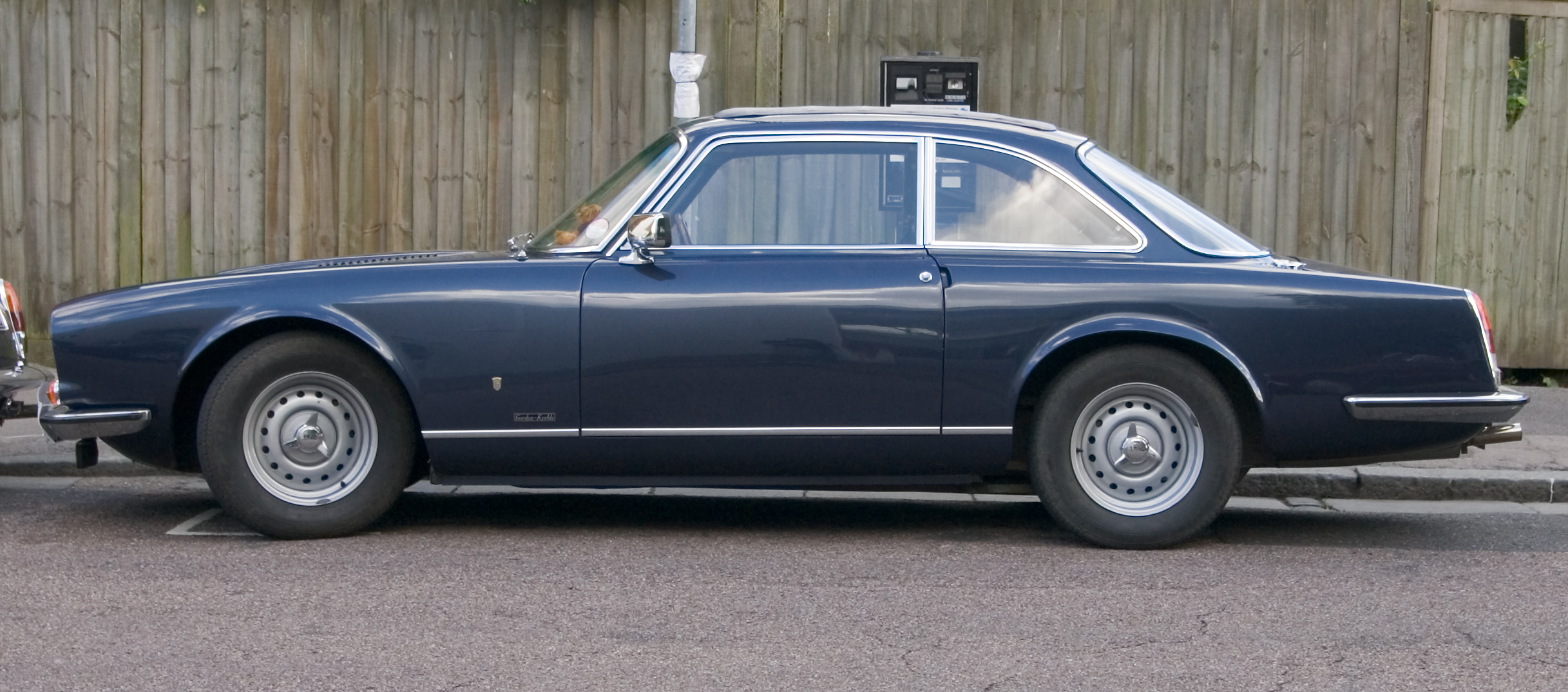
Side view

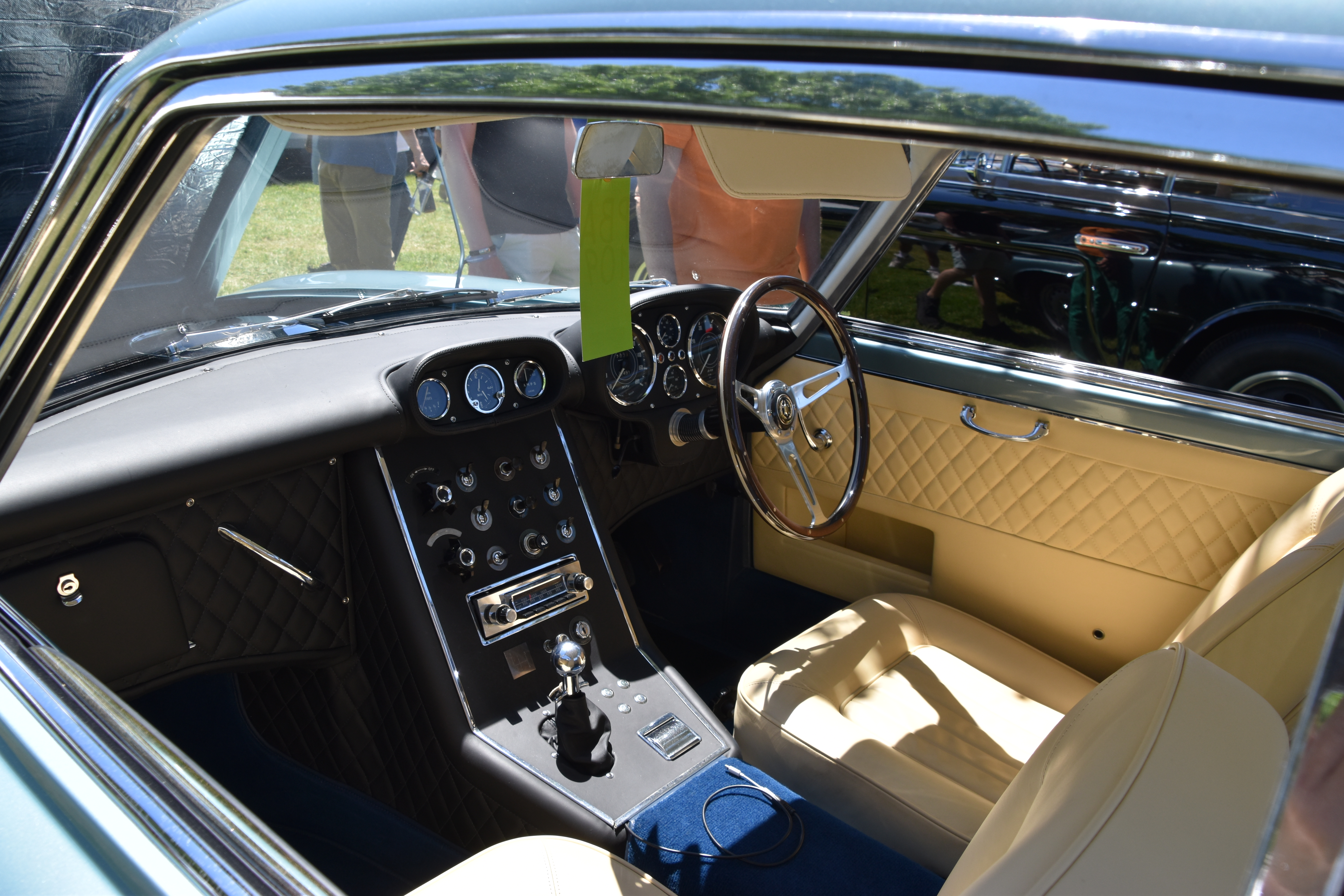
1964 Gordon Keeble interior

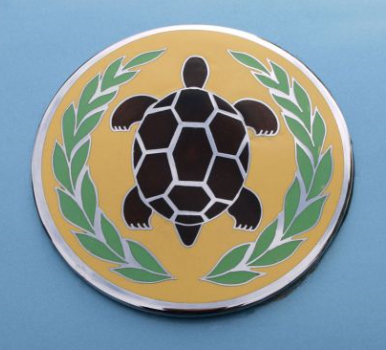
Gordon-Keeble bonnet emblem

== See also ==
- List of car manufacturers of the United Kingdom
