= Lotus Mark VIII =

Racing car

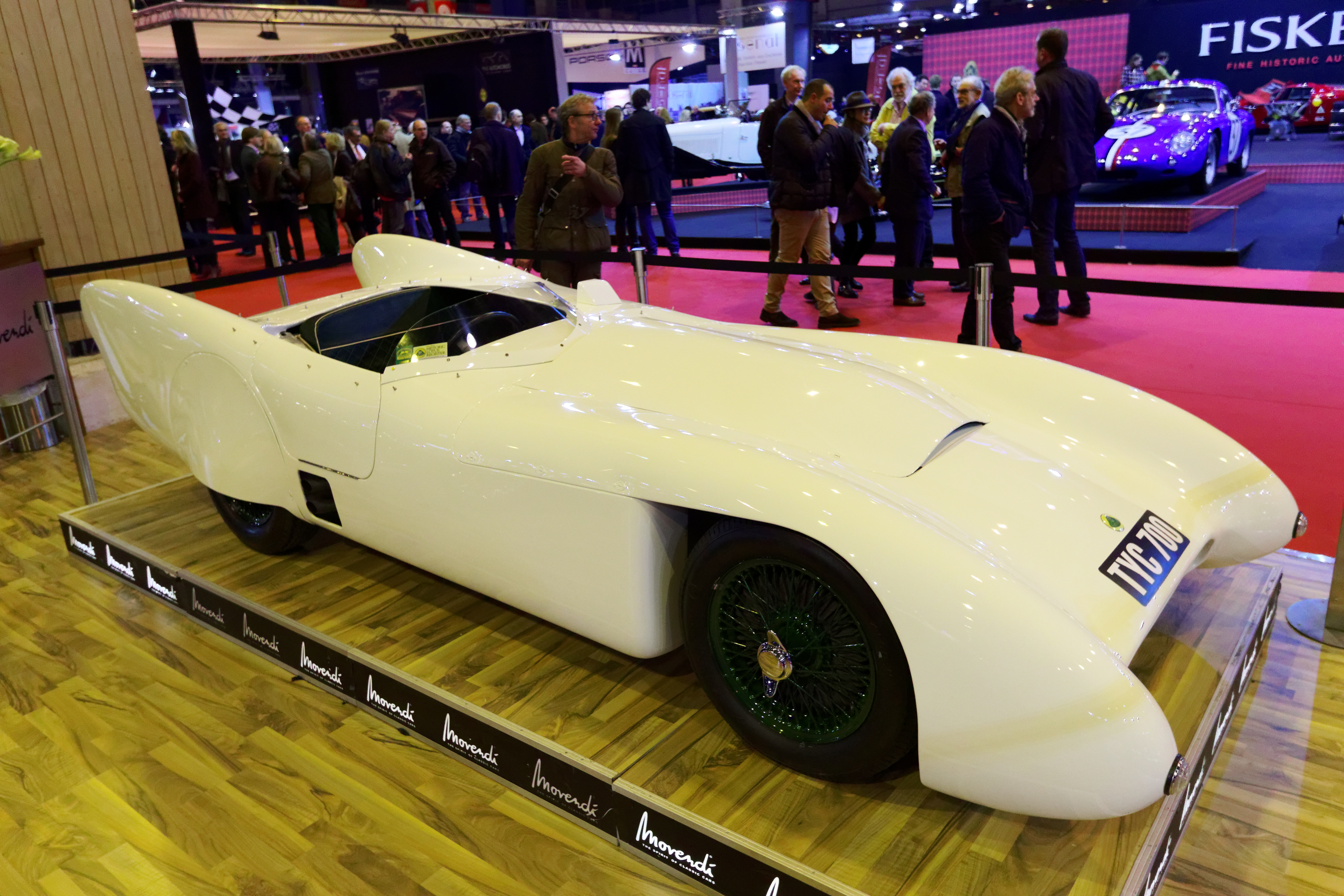
A Lotus Mark VIII - 1955

The Lotus Mark VIII car was Colin Chapman’s first fully enclosed aerodynamic design. Chapman's basic requirements for the design were for a car of 1100 lbs powered by an 85 bhp engine and a maximum speed of 125 mph. Work began on this design in late 1953 and Chapman was assisted in the design of the body by the aerodynamicist Frank Costin, who was the brother of Mike Costin, his main collaborator.

The spaceframe chassis for the Mark VIII has been described as "the most nearly perfect sports car chassis". This was Lotus' first true spaceframe and relied on the aircraft experience of Peter Ross and Gilbert McIntosh. Extremely light (the total weight of the frame alone was only 35 lbs) and very stiff, the frame consisted of only nineteen members and was fully triangulated. However, from a practical point of view, the frame had limitations, mostly regarding maintenance; in order to install the engine, it had to be disassembled and then reassembled inside the framework.

The spaceframe retained the divided front axle independent suspension that Chapman had employed on his earlier cars, and used a de Dion layout with inboard brakes at the rear. A modified MG 1500 cc engine and transmission were installed, and a stressed undertray further stiffened the chassis.

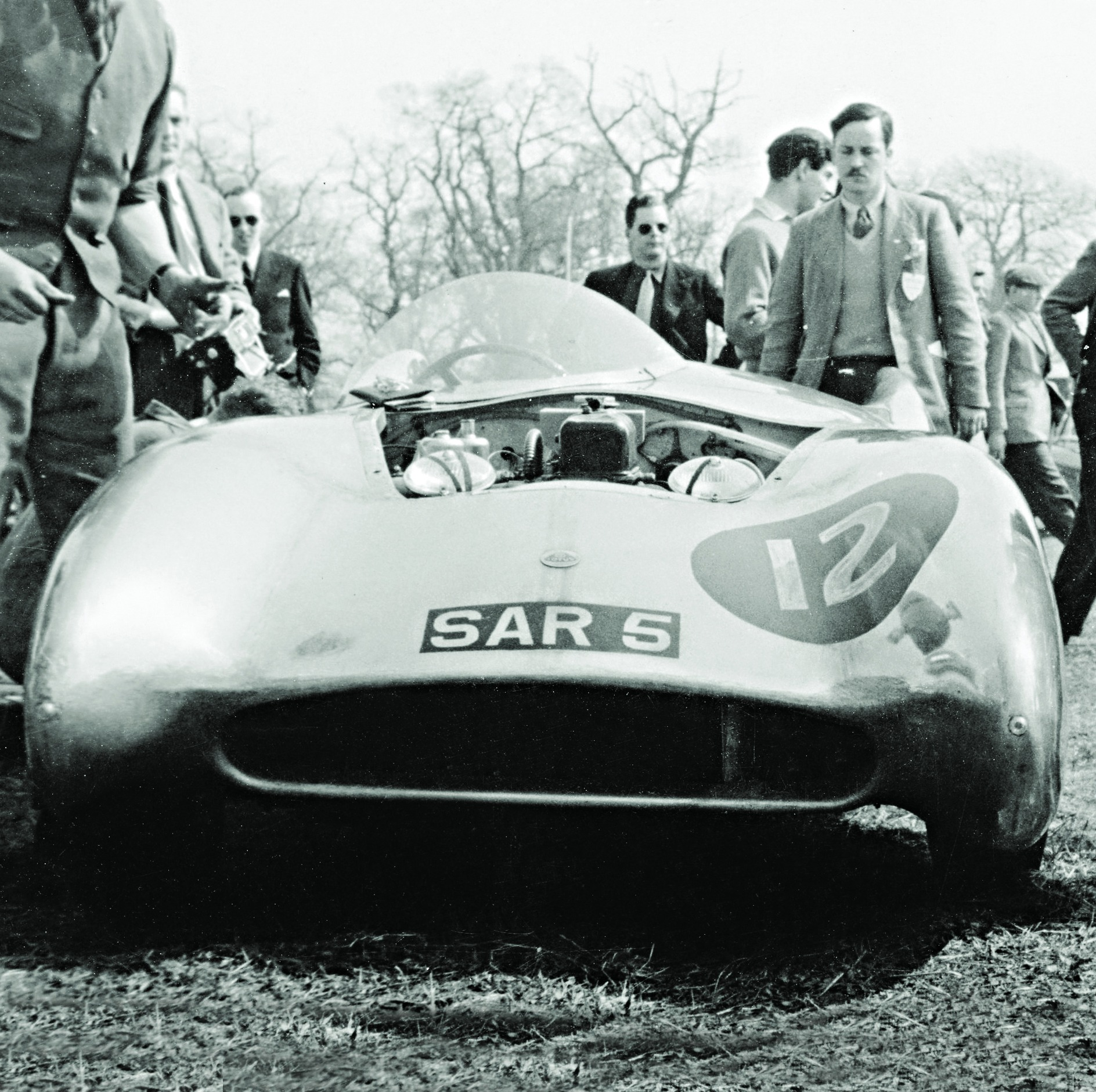
The VIII prototype at the first race at Oulton Park on 10 April 1954.

In its first race at Oulton Park, Chapman set the fastest lap of the day in Mark VIII prototype, which was designated P3, but had to retire because of a blown head gasket. However, at the next race at Silverstone Chapman won the 1,500 cc. class outright. It was at a subsequent meeting of the RAC British Grand Prix at Silverstone, on 17 July 1954, where the reputation of Lotus cars was made, as Chapman in the Lotus Mark VIII and Peter Gammon in the Mark VI beat the works quad-cam Porsche driven by Hans Herrmann, again winning the class.

The Mark VIII was a precursor to the later aerodynamic Lotus cars.

== Mark X ==
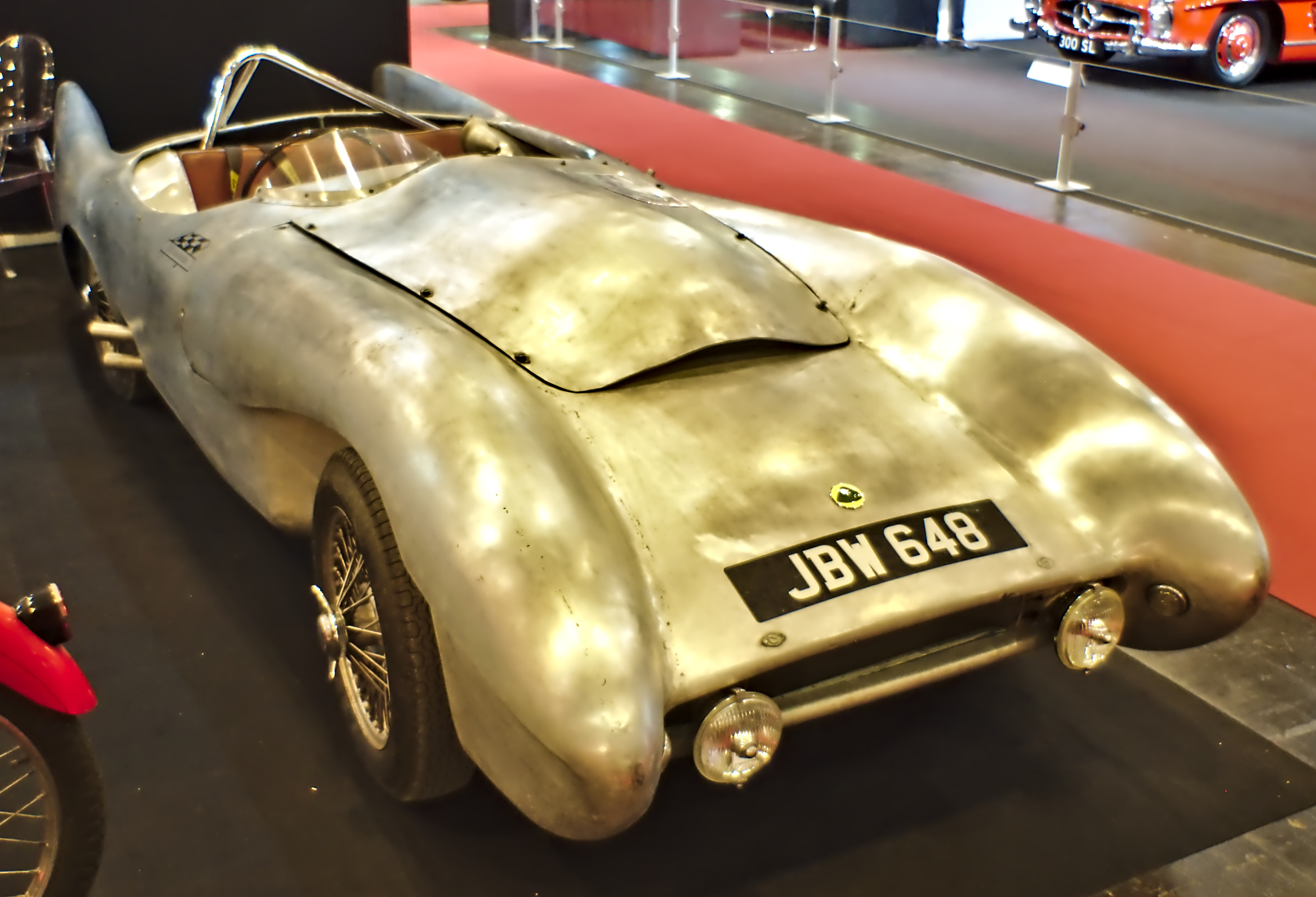
Lotus Mark X

The Lotus Mark X was an aluminium-bodied sports racing car manufactured by Lotus Engineering Ltd. The Mark X, of which only 6 or 7 were made, was essentially identical to the Mark VIII but made use of the larger 2.0-litre Bristol engine. The Mark VIII, Mark IX and Mark X were transitional forms, although they represent the first full bodied aerodynamic Lotus sports cars and made use of the De Dion tube as a rear suspension locator, together with inboard rear brakes. The more successful Lotus Eleven, of which 270 were manufactured between 1956 and 1958, was the direct descendant of these earlier cars. The earlier cars are today considered rare and highly valued collectible automobiles — even museum pieces — but can still be seen raced in vintage events.
