= Ikenga GT =

British prototype automobile

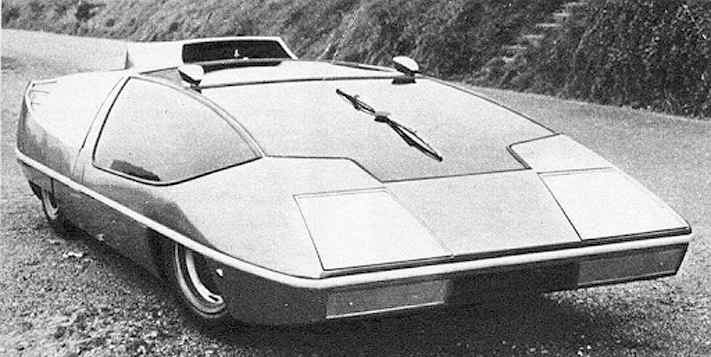
- Ikenga GT Mk III

Overview
- Designer: David Gittens

Body and chassis
- Layout: Rear mid-engine, rear-wheel-drive layout
- Platform: McLaren M1B
- Doors: Canopy door

Powertrain
- Engine: OHV V8
- Transmission: ZF 5-speed manual

Dimensions
- Wheelbase: 92 in (2,337 mm)
- Length: 163 in (4,140 mm)
- Width: 70 in (1,778 mm)
- Height: 38 in (965 mm)
- Curb weight: 1,800 lb (816 kg)

The Ikenga GT is a series of three prototype GT automobile designs that were built in the United Kingdom between 1967 and 1969. The MkI, MkII and MkIII were the three styling iterations.

== History ==
David Gittens is an Igbo, Nigerian-American artist and designer who was a staff photographer at Car and Driver magazine from 1958 to 1964. He was born in Brooklyn, and in 1964 he married and moved to London England, where he did photographic work for advertising and fashion publications. In 1967 he embarked on a career in transportation design. Among his proposed projects were a gas-powered single seat city car, an electric city car, a Reliant-based three-wheeled car, an expandable six-wheeled vehicle, a small car based on the Mini Moke chassis, and a high-performance mid-engined grand touring car that became the Ikenga GT.

Gittens bought a used McLaren chassis from Ken Sheppard. Sheppard was also to handle limited production of the car. For development Gittens turned to Charles Williams of Williams & Pritchard coachbuilders.

The car's name is of Nigerian origin. Ikenga is a spirit often represented by a horned statue in Gittens' ancestral Igbo culture. Ikenga represents human achievement, accomplishment, and success.

The first version of the car, later referred to as the MkI, was completed in 1967. The somewhat blocky design of the MkI was quickly followed by the restyled MkII in 1968. In addition to the revised body shape, this version received a leather interior and an accompanying set of Gucci luggage. Some advanced lighting features were also introduced with the MkII.

In October 1968, during the Earls Court Motor Show, the Ikenga MkII was displayed at the Banking Hall at Harrods. This location was chosen due to there being no provision for displaying experimental or prototype vehicles at the motor show venue. 30,000 people saw the car at the Banking Hall, including one who offered $53,000 for the prototype, and a Saudi prince who commissioned a unique version of the car to be called the "Bird of Peace" at a cost of $35,000. This special does not appear to have been built.

Gittens planned a limited run of cars. Depending on the source, he planned 100 or 150 cars, priced at £9000 or US$16,800 each.

Gittens also promoted the car in the United States. The MkII appeared on the cover of the April 1969 issue of Car and Driver magazine. In June 1969, after a year of negotiations with an American group for the US distribution rights to the Ikenga series of vehicles, a contract was approved. Later that day Charles Williams died suddenly. This was while the car was undergoing another restyling that would result in the MkIII. The car was transferred to the Radford coachworks to have the work completed with the assistance of Gary Williams and Roger Nathan, among others. The car was complete by October 1969. It appeared in an episode of the BBC series Tomorrow's World, then was sent to France where it was displayed in Paris during the 1969 Paris Auto Show. From there the car went to Italy, where it received acclaim at the Turin Auto Show. In March 1970 the car appeared as the featured vehicle in the Swedish International Motor Show in Stockholm.

Eventually the car was returned to England (from its storage in St. Paul de Paul, France to honor A.T.A. Carnet #10477) via Copley's Bank. It made an appearance on the UK children's television show Blue Peter on 20 September 1976. Gittens returned to the United States and lost contact with the vehicle until it appeared in a for-sale ad in Road & Track magazine about 1980. Only one Ikenga GT was ever built.

The car was displayed at the Manx Motor Museum for some time and then was sold at auction in 1998 and again in 2008. It is believed to be somewhere in the Middle East.

Gittens would go on to use the name Ikenga again for a Catamaran (1976) and a line of gyroplanes (1985 to 1992). The 1988 Ikenga 530Z autogyro is part of the collection of the Smithsonian National Air and Space Museum in Washington DC. The Ikenga Cygnus 21-TX autogyro is at the American Helicopter Museum & Education Center in West Chester, Pennsylvania.

== Features ==
=== Body and chassis ===
The Ikenga GT was built on a McLaren-Elva Group 7 chassis. The chassis model was a McLaren M1B.

The aluminium bodywork was formed over the tubular steel frame.

The body of the Ikenga was meant to be evocative of an African mask facing skyward to Spirit. The cockpit canopy represented the "crown" of the mask, the front wheel bodywork the "horns", the raised intake on the roof the "nose", and the rear deck lid the "mouth".

=== Engine and transmission ===
The chassis' original race-tuned Traco-Oldsmobile engine was replaced by a stock version of the lightweight 3.5 litre Rover V8 engine that had originally been designed by General Motors and used by their Buick and Oldsmobile divisions. Several references report that the car later had some version of a Chevrolet OHV V8 engine.^{Note 1} Power output was estimated to have been 325 hp (242 kW).

The car's transmission was the ZF 5-speed transaxle from the McLaren.

=== Innovations ===
The car had many advanced features, some of which were developed by Gittens and company, and some by the Imperial College. Among them were:

- A rear deck lid that doubled as an air brake.
- On-board television and rear-view camera
- A luminescent roof lining
- Fluorescent-tube headlamps
- A telematics radio system to warn of road problems ahead
- A collision warning system
- Ultrasonic parking sensors
- A tilt-away steering wheel

=== Performance ===
- Top speed was estimated to be 162 mph (261 km/h).
- The standing quarter-mile was covered in 12.5 seconds.
- Acceleration from 0 to 100 mph (0 to 160 km/h) took 11.5 seconds.

== Gallery ==
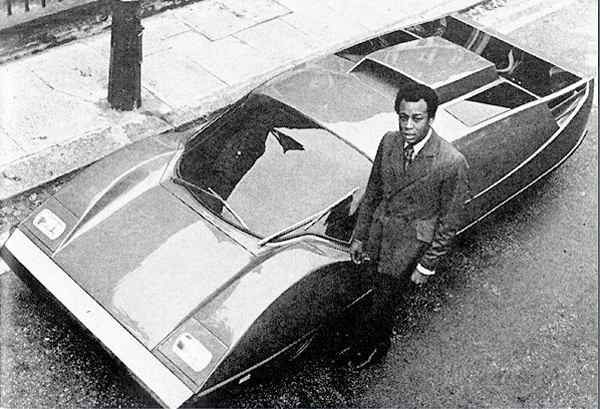
David Gittens with the Ikenga GT MkII

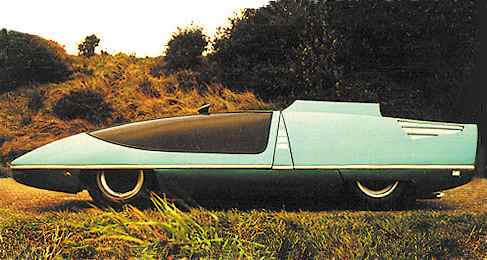
Ikenga GT MkIII side profile

== Notes ==
Note 1 Some references, including company brochures, say that the Ikenga GT later received an engine from the first generation Camaro Z-28 — a 302 cu in (4.9 L) solid-lifter small-block V8. One source, while referring to the Z-28, says that the engine displaced 396 cu in (6.5 L), which would have made it a big-block engine only available in the Camaro with the SS package. Displacements ranging from 5.3 to 5.6 litres are reported by other sources.
