= Peerless (UK car) =

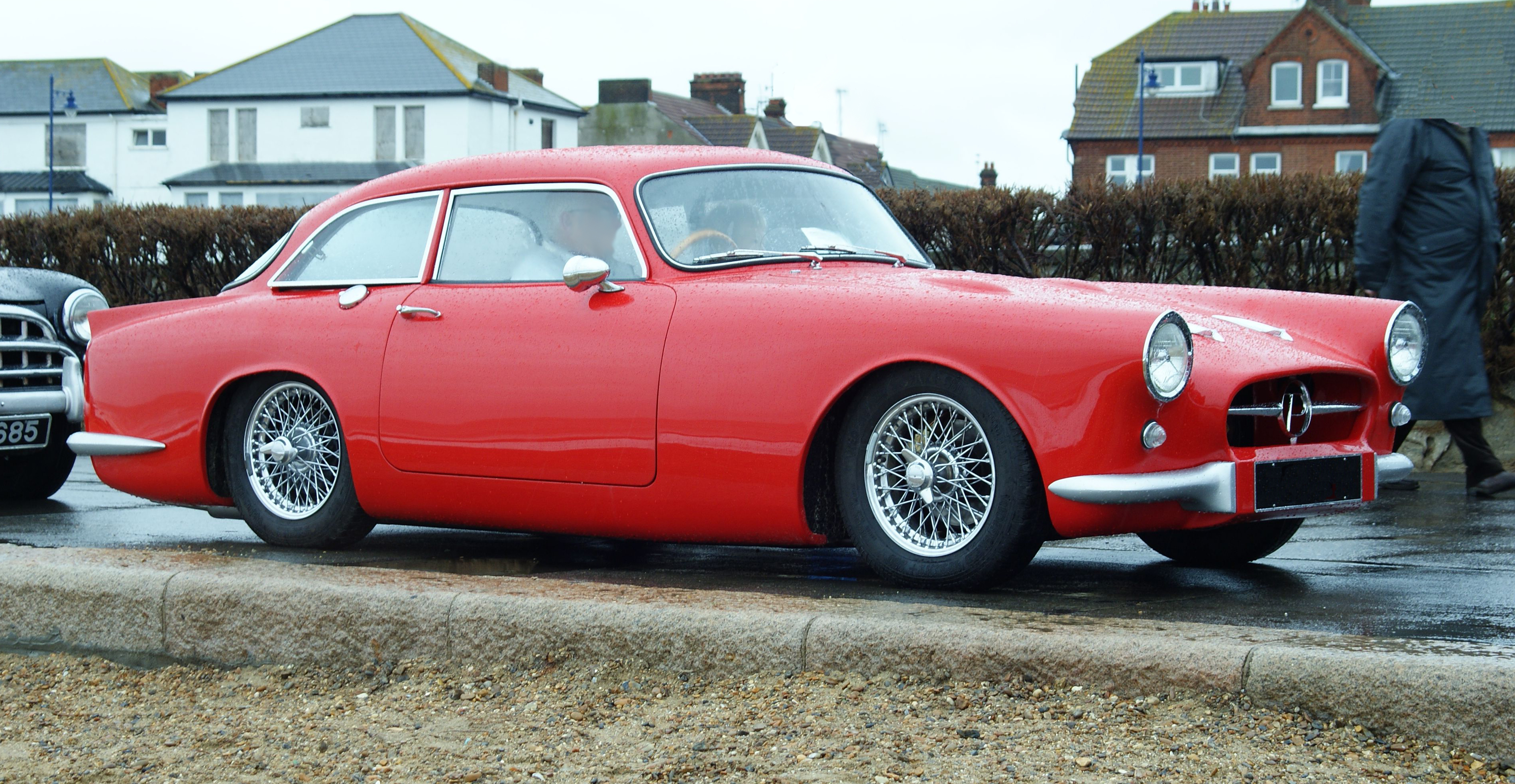
1958 Peerless

The Peerless was a British car manufactured by Peerless Cars Ltd. of Slough, Berkshire, between 1957 and 1960, when the company failed. The company was resurrected by one of the original founders, Bernie Rodger, as Bernard Roger Developments BRD Ltd and marketed as the Warwick from a base in Colnbrook, Buckinghamshire, between 1960 and 1962.

== Peerless ==
The prototype of this British-built sports saloon, which was alloy bodied and initially named the Warwick, was designed by Bernie Rodger for company founders John Gordon and James Byrnes.

The car had been renamed the Peerless GT by the time series production started in 1957. It featured Triumph TR3 running gear in a tubular space frame with de Dion tube rear suspension clothed in attractive fibreglass 4-seater bodywork. While the car had good performance, it was expensive to produce, and its overall fit and finish was not as good as that of similarly priced models from mainstream manufacturers. The Phase II version had an improved body largely moulded in one piece.

About 325 were made.

A works car was entered in the 1958 24 Hours of Le Mans, finishing 16th and winning its class.

Production ceased in 1960 after about 325 examples had been produced.

== Warwick ==
Warwick GT
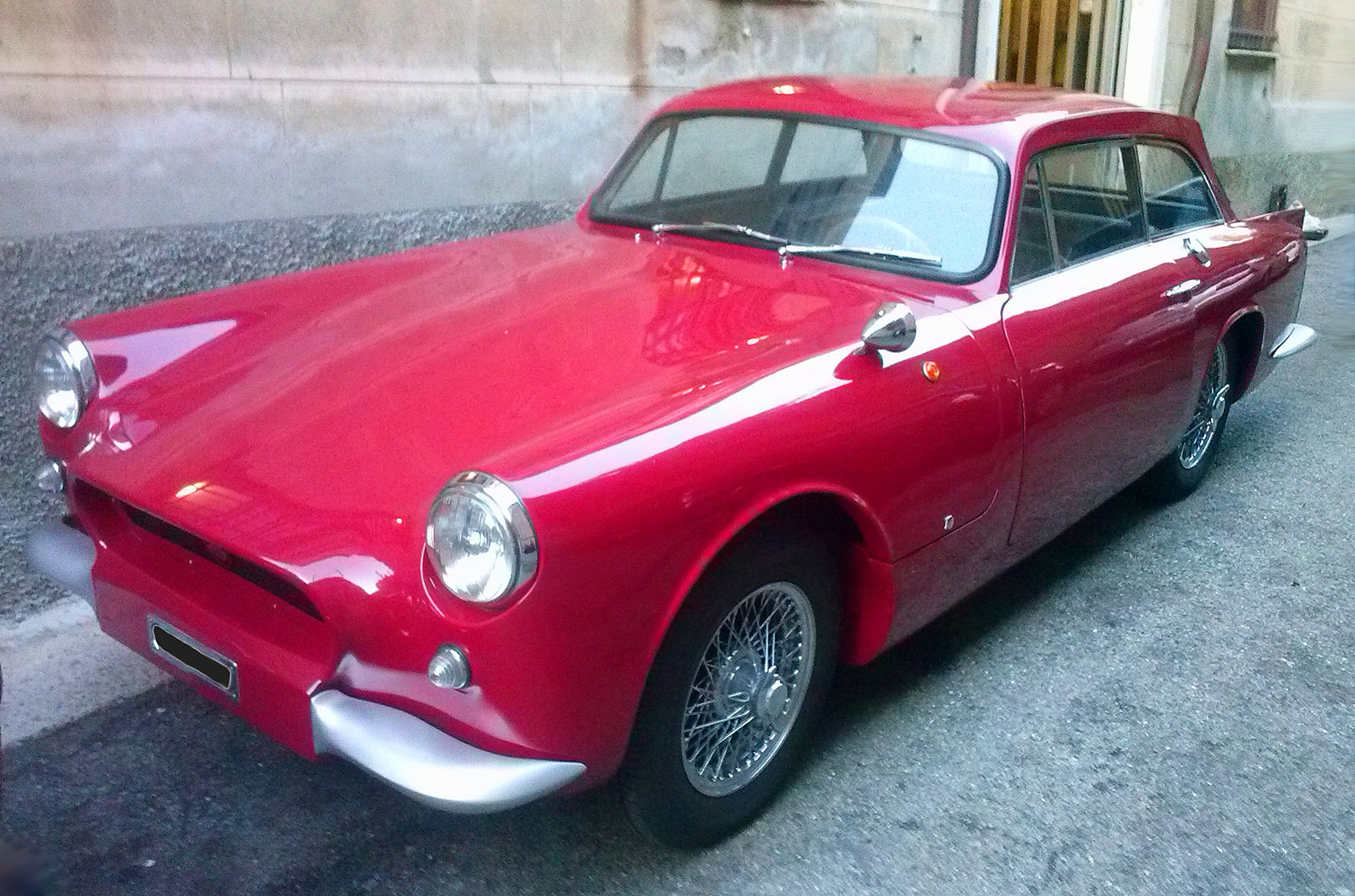
- 1961 Warwick GT

Overview
- Production: 1960–1962

Body and chassis
- Layout: FR layout

Powertrain
- Engine: 1991 cc

Dimensions
- Wheelbase: 94 in (2,388 mm)
- Length: 175 in (4,445 mm)
- Width: 64 in (1,626 mm)
- Height: 51 in (1,295 mm)

Bernie Rodger restarted production of the car as the Warwick, a much-improved version of the original Peerless GT car with minor cosmetic changes such as a one-piece forward-hinged front end, a stiffer space-frame chassis, and a revised dashboard. Although it was produced from 1960 to 1962, only about 40 cars are thought to have been built.

A car was tested by the British magazine The Motor in 1961 and was found to have a top speed of 105.3 mph (169.5 km/h) and could accelerate from 0-60 mph (97 km/h) in 12.6 seconds. A fuel consumption of 32 mpg_{‑imp} (8.8 L/100 km; 27 mpg_{‑US}) was recorded. The test car cost £1666 including taxes.

Two prototypes of a successor car, the 3.5 Litre or GT350, were made in 1961 and featured the light alloy Buick V8 engine that was later taken up by Rover.

John Gordon, together with Jim Keeble (who had previously inserted a Buick V-8 engine into a Peerless), subsequently used the Peerless space-frame as the basis for a Chevrolet-powered car with Giugiaro-designed, Bertone-built bodywork, initially shown in 1960 as the Gordon GT, and which eventually reached production in 1964 as the Gordon-Keeble.

== See also ==
- List of car manufacturers of the United Kingdom
