= Canton of Saint-Savinien =

Coordinates: 45°53′N 0°40′W

Saint-Savinien
- Former canton
- Interactive map of Saint-Savinien
- Country: France
- Region: Nouvelle-Aquitaine
- Department: Charente-Maritime
- No. of communes: {{{nbcomm}}}
- Disbanded: 2015
- Area: 166.25 km^{2} (64.19 sq mi)
- Population (2012): 7,511
  - Density: 45.18/km^{2} (117.0/sq mi)

The Canton of Saint-Savinien is a former canton of the Charente-Maritime département, in France. It was disbanded following the French canton reorganisation which came into effect in March 2015. It consisted of 11 communes, which joined the canton of Saint-Jean-d'Angély in 2015. It had 7,511 inhabitants (2012). Its postal codes were 17350, 17380 and 17430. The lowest point is the river Charente near Bords (3 m), the highest point is near Fenioux (102 m). The canton seat was Saint-Savinien.

== Communes ==
The canton comprised the following communes:

- Annepont
- Archingeay
- Bords
- Champdolent
- Fenioux
- Grandjean
- Le Mung
- Les Nouillers
- Saint-Savinien
- Taillant
- Taillebourg

== Population history ==
Year	Population
1962	6,147
1968	6,496
1975	6,190
1982	6,467
1990	6,461
1999	6,606
2008	7,125
2012	7,511

== See also ==
- Cantons of the Charente-Maritime department
