= Arrondissement of Saint-Jean-d'Angély =

Coordinates: 45.95°N 0.52°W

Saint-Jean-d'Angély
- Arrondissement
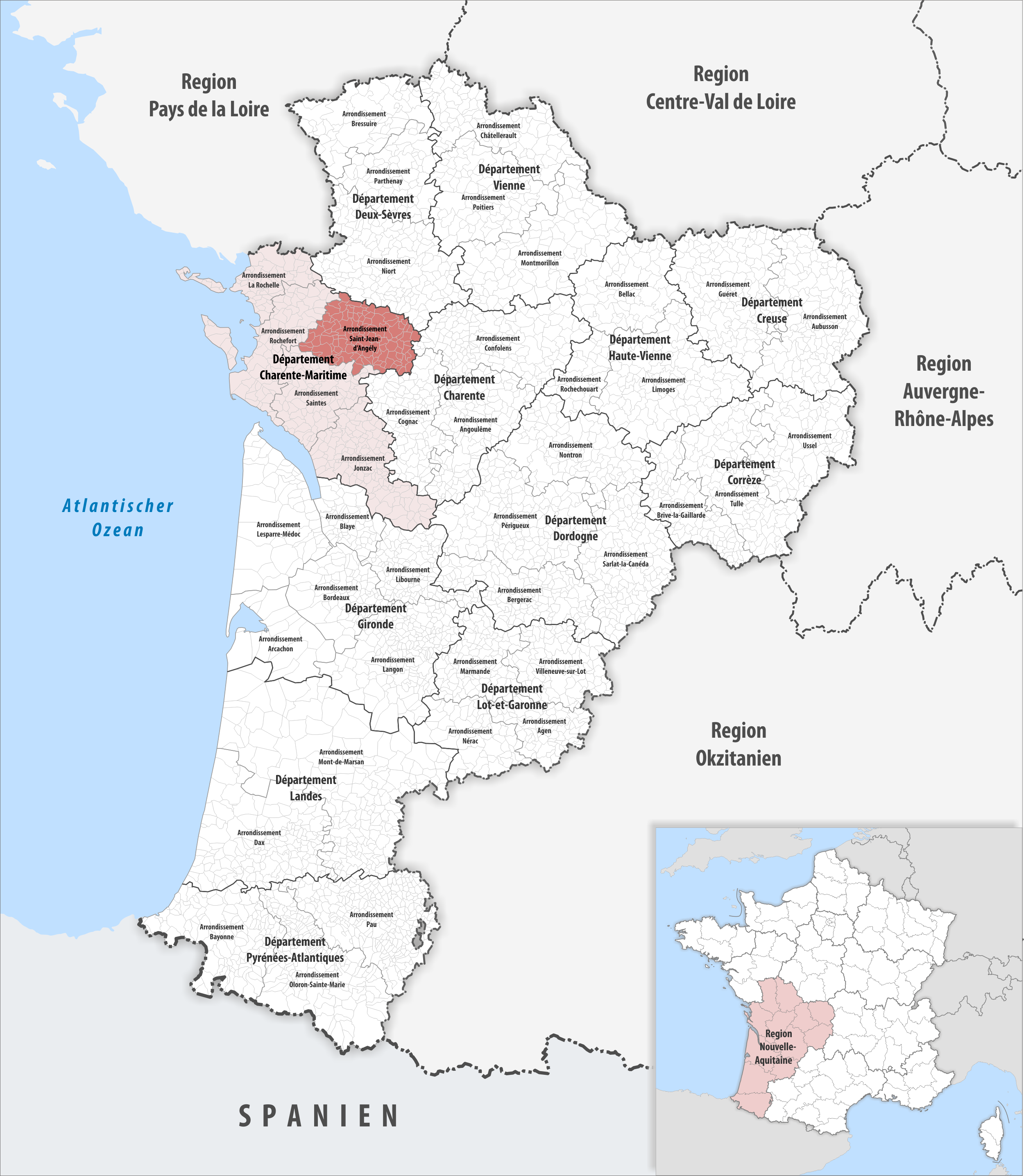
- Location within the region Nouvelle-Aquitaine
- Country: France
- Region: Nouvelle-Aquitaine
- Department: Charente-Maritime
- No. of communes: {{{nbcomm}}}
- Area: 1,416.0 km^{2} (546.7 sq mi)
- Population (2023): 52,774
  - Density: 37.270/km^{2} (96.528/sq mi)
- INSEE code: 175

The arrondissement of Saint-Jean-d'Angély is an arrondissement of France in the Charente-Maritime department in the Nouvelle-Aquitaine region. It has 109 communes. Its population is 52,150 (2021), and its area is 1,416.0 km^{2} (546.7 sq mi).

== Composition ==
The communes of the arrondissement of Saint-Jean-d'Angély, and their INSEE codes, are:

1. Annepont (17011)
2. Annezay (17012)
3. Antezant-la-Chapelle (17013)
4. Archingeay (17017)
5. Asnières-la-Giraud (17022)
6. Aujac (17023)
7. Aulnay (17024)
8. Aumagne (17025)
9. Authon-Ébéon (17026)
10. Bagnizeau (17029)
11. Ballans (17031)
12. Bazauges (17035)
13. Beauvais-sur-Matha (17037)
14. Bercloux (17042)
15. Bernay-Saint-Martin (17043)
16. Bignay (17046)
17. Blanzac-lès-Matha (17048)
18. Blanzay-sur-Boutonne (17049)
19. Bords (17053)
20. Bresdon (17062)
21. Brie-sous-Matha (17067)
22. Brizambourg (17070)
23. La Brousse (17071)
24. Champdolent (17085)
25. Chantemerle-sur-la-Soie (17087)
26. Cherbonnières (17101)
27. Chives (17105)
28. Coivert (17114)
29. Contré (17117)
30. Courant (17124)
31. Courcelles (17125)
32. Courcerac (17126)
33. Cressé (17135)
34. La Croix-Comtesse (17137)
35. Dampierre-sur-Boutonne (17138)
36. Dœuil-sur-le-Mignon (17139)
37. Les Éduts (17149)
38. Les Églises-d'Argenteuil (17150)
39. Essouvert (17277)
40. Fenioux (17157)
41. Fontaine-Chalendray (17162)
42. Fontenet (17165)
43. Gibourne (17176)
44. Le Gicq (17177)
45. Gourvillette (17180)
46. Grandjean (17181)
47. Haimps (17188)
48. La Jarrie-Audouin (17195)
49. Juicq (17198)
50. Landes (17202)
51. Loiré-sur-Nie (17206)
52. Loulay (17211)
53. Louzignac (17212)
54. Lozay (17213)
55. Macqueville (17217)
56. Massac (17223)
57. Matha (17224)
58. Mazeray (17226)
59. Migré (17234)
60. Mons (17239)
61. Le Mung (17252)
62. Nachamps (17254)
63. Nantillé (17256)
64. Neuvicq-le-Château (17261)
65. Les Nouillers (17266)
66. Néré (17257)
67. Paillé (17271)
68. Poursay-Garnaud (17288)
69. Prignac (17290)
70. Puy-du-Lac (17292)
71. Puyrolland (17294)
72. Rives-de-Boutonne (17268)
73. Romazières (17301)
74. Sainte-Même (17374)
75. Saint-Félix (17327)
76. Saint-Hilaire-de-Villefranche (17344)
77. Saint-Jean-d'Angély (17347)
78. Saint-Julien-de-l'Escap (17350)
79. Saint-Loup (17356)
80. Saint-Mandé-sur-Brédoire (17358)
81. Saint-Martial (17361)
82. Saint-Martin-de-Juillers (17367)
83. Saint-Ouen-la-Thène (17377)
84. Saint-Pardoult (17381)
85. Saint-Pierre-de-Juillers (17383)
86. Saint-Pierre-de-l'Isle (17384)
87. Saint-Savinien (17397)
88. Saint-Séverin-sur-Boutonne (17401)
89. Saleignes (17416)
90. Seigné (17422)
91. Siecq (17427)
92. Sonnac (17428)
93. Taillant (17435)
94. Taillebourg (17436)
95. Ternant (17440)
96. Thors (17446)
97. Tonnay-Boutonne (17448)
98. Les Touches-de-Périgny (17451)
99. Torxé (17450)
100. Varaize (17459)
101. La Vergne (17465)
102. Vergné (17464)
103. Vervant (17467)
104. La Villedieu (17471)
105. Villemorin (17473)
106. Villeneuve-la-Comtesse (17474)
107. Villiers-Couture (17477)
108. Vinax (17478)
109. Voissay (17481)

== History ==
The arrondissement of Saint-Jean-d'Angély was created in 1800, disbanded in 1926 and restored in 1943. At the January 2017 reorganisation of the arrondissements of Charente-Maritime, it lost three communes to the arrondissement of Rochefort.

As a result of the reorganisation of the cantons of France which came into effect in 2015, the borders of the cantons are no longer related to the borders of the arrondissements. The cantons of the arrondissement of Saint-Jean-d'Angély were, as of January 2015:

1. Aulnay
2. Loulay
3. Matha
4. Saint-Hilaire-de-Villefranche
5. Saint-Jean-d'Angély
6. Saint-Savinien
7. Tonnay-Boutonne
