= Lozay =

- Commune
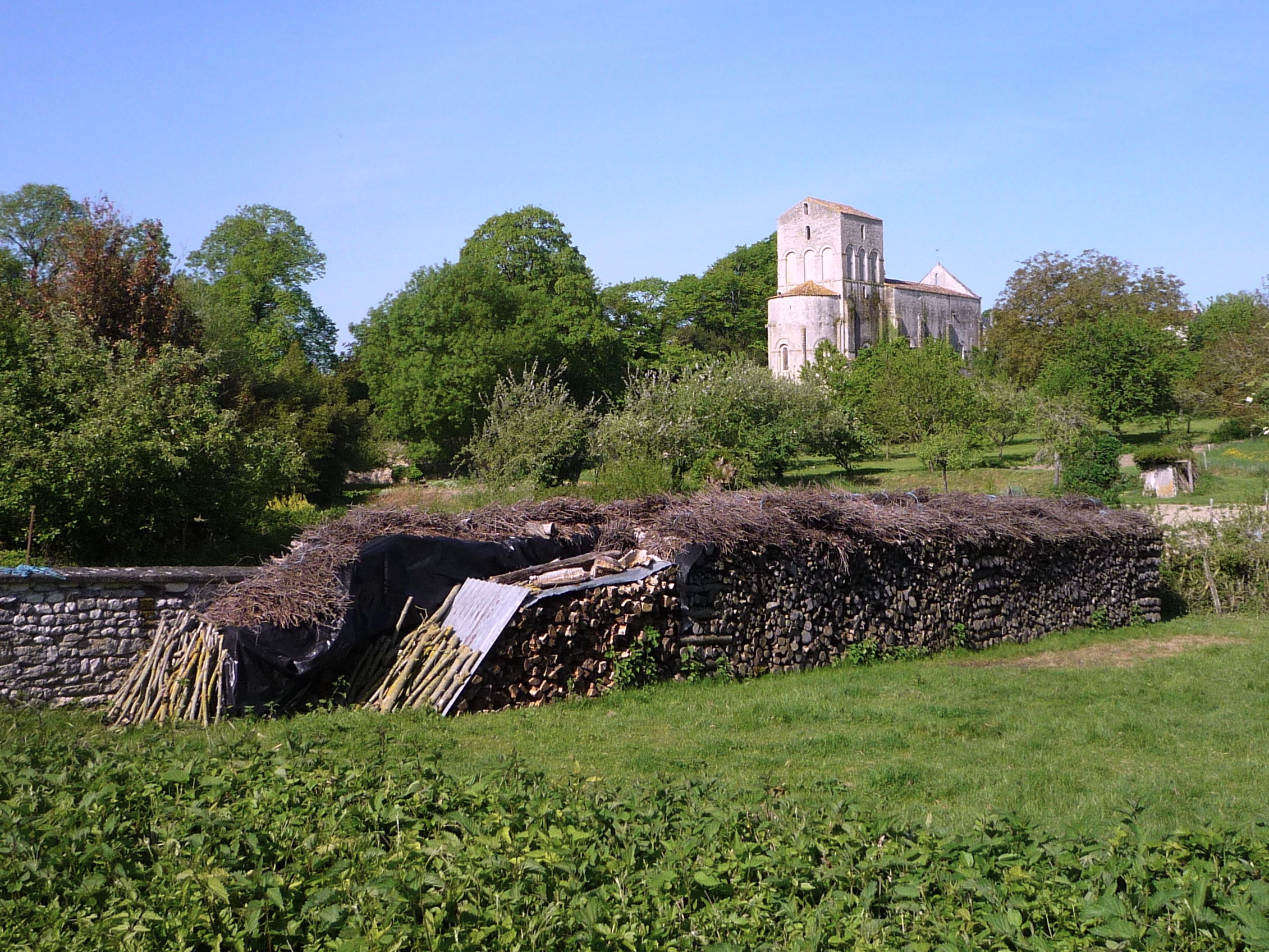
- The church and surroundings in Lozay
- Location of Lozay
- Location within France Location within Nouvelle-Aquitaine
- Coordinates: 46°02′32″N 0°32′46″W
- Country: France
- Region: Nouvelle-Aquitaine
- Department: Charente-Maritime
- Arrondissement: Saint-Jean-d'Angély
- Canton: Saint-Jean-d'Angély

Government
  - Mayor (2020–2026): Jean-Michel Charpentier
- Area^{1}: 11.85 km^{2} (4.58 sq mi)
- Elevation: 60 m (200 ft)
- Highest elevation: 106 m (348 ft)
- Lowest elevation: 31 m (102 ft)
- Population (2023): 165
  - Density: 13.9/km^{2} (36.1/sq mi)
- Time zone: UTC+01:00 (CET)
  - Summer (DST): UTC+02:00 (CEST)
- INSEE/Postal code: 17213 /17330
- ^{1} French Land Register data, which excludes lakes, ponds, glaciers > 1 km^{2} (0.386 sq mi or 247 acres) and river estuaries.

Lozay (French pronunciation: [lɔzɛ]) is a commune in the Charente-Maritime department in southwestern France.

== Population ==
Historical population
Year	Pop.	±% p.a.
1968	270	—
1975	223	−2.70%
1982	192	−2.12%
1990	170	−1.51%
1999	184	+0.88%
2007	160	−1.73%
2012	154	−0.76%
2017	136	−2.46%
2023	165	+3.27%
Source: INSEE

== Sights ==
- Saint Peter's is a 12th-century fortified church which was classed as a Monument Historique (Historic Monument) in 1953. A high altar and tabernacle with a candle holder consisting of two figures in gilded wood adorns the interior. This has been protected since November 30, 1984.
- A washhouse and fountain are located below the village, in Puy Bardon.
- The Essouvert wood is located 1.5 km south-east of the village.
- A replica of the lantern of the dead of Fenioux was built on the rest area from the A10 Paris-Bordeaux highway in 1994.

== See also ==
- Communes of the Charente-Maritime department
