= Loulay =

- Commune
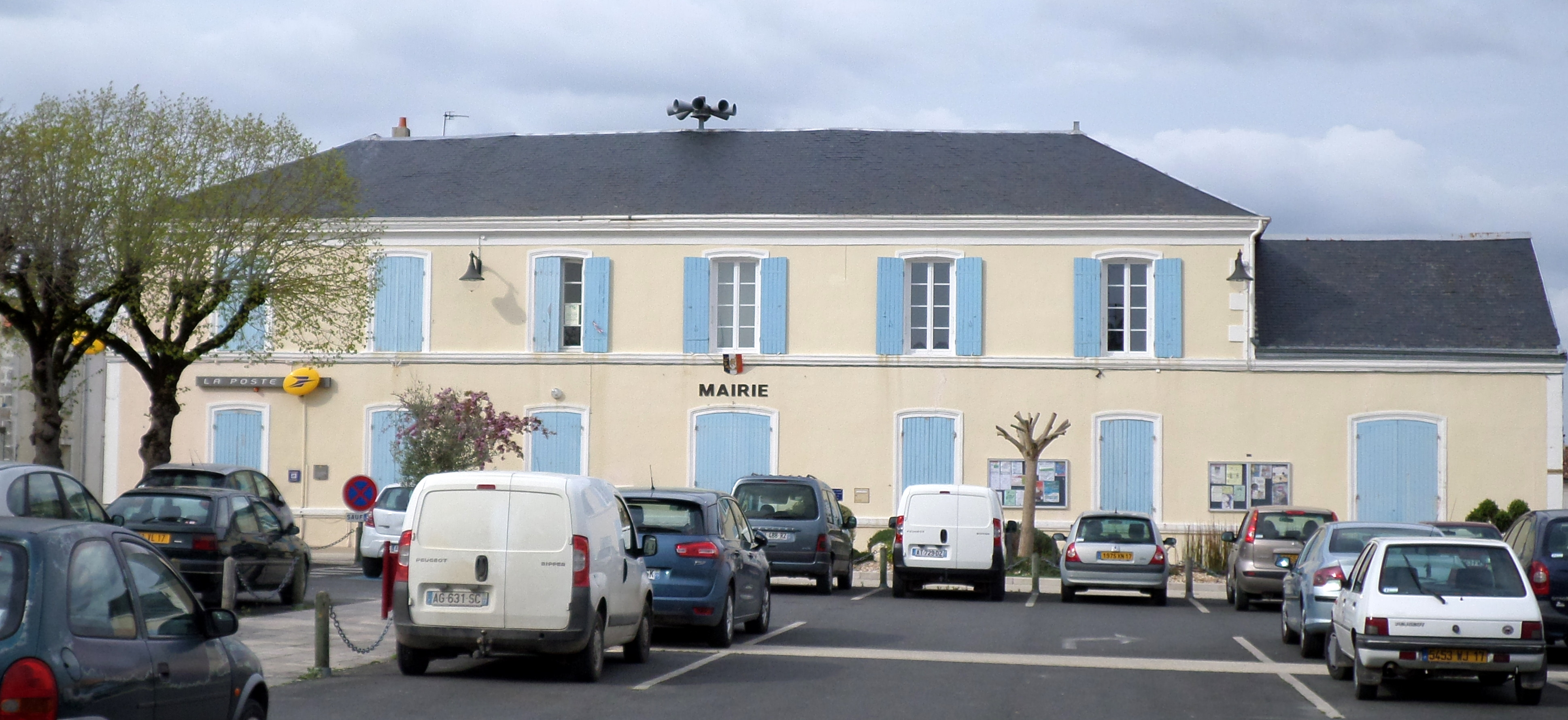
- The town hall in Loulay
- Location of Loulay
- Location within France Location within Nouvelle-Aquitaine
- Coordinates: 46°02′52″N 0°30′40″W
- Country: France
- Region: Nouvelle-Aquitaine
- Department: Charente-Maritime
- Arrondissement: Saint-Jean-d'Angély
- Canton: Saint-Jean-d'Angély
- Intercommunality: Vals de Saintonge

Government
  - Mayor (2020–2026): Maurice Perrier
- Area^{1}: 7.3 km^{2} (2.8 sq mi)
- Highest elevation: 92 m (302 ft)
- Lowest elevation: 41 m (135 ft)
- Population (2023): 760
  - Density: 100/km^{2} (270/sq mi)
- Time zone: UTC+01:00 (CET)
  - Summer (DST): UTC+02:00 (CEST)
- INSEE/Postal code: 17211 /17330
- ^{1} French Land Register data, which excludes lakes, ponds, glaciers > 1 km^{2} (0.386 sq mi or 247 acres) and river estuaries.

Loulay (French pronunciation: [lulɛ]) is a commune in the Charente-Maritime department in southwestern France.

== Population ==
Historical population
Year	Pop.	±% p.a.
1968	764	—
1975	667	−1.92%
1982	728	+1.26%
1990	786	+0.96%
1999	759	−0.39%
2007	750	−0.15%
2012	804	+1.40%
2017	766	−0.96%
2023	760	−0.13%
Source: INSEE

== See also ==
- Communes of the Charente-Maritime department
