= Migré =

- Commune
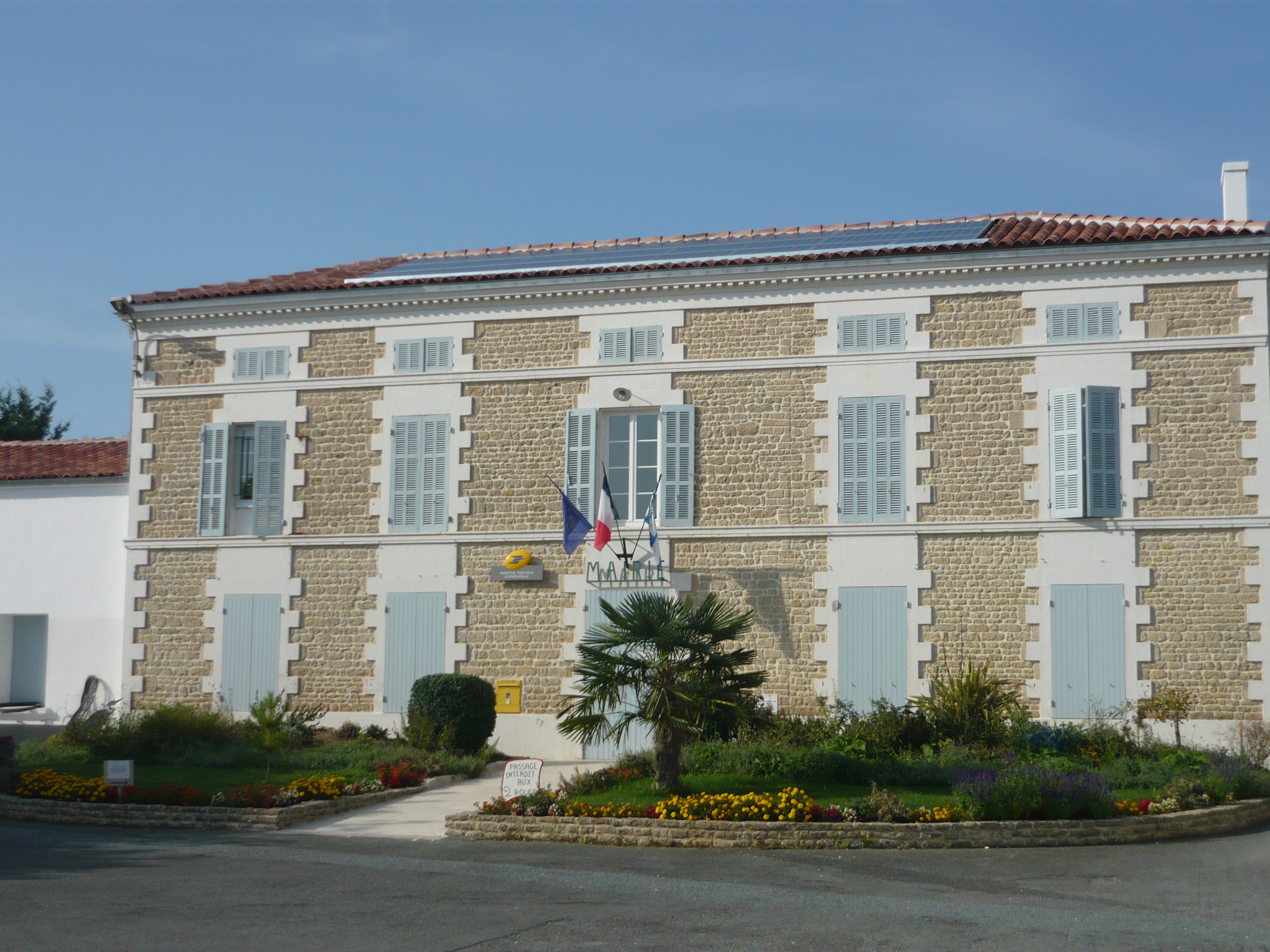
- The town hall in Migré
- Location of Migré
- Location within France Location within Nouvelle-Aquitaine
- Coordinates: 46°04′31″N 0°33′23″W
- Country: France
- Region: Nouvelle-Aquitaine
- Department: Charente-Maritime
- Arrondissement: Saint-Jean-d'Angély
- Canton: Saint-Jean-d'Angély

Government
  - Mayor (2020–2026): Gerard Bielka
- Area^{1}: 14.3 km^{2} (5.5 sq mi)
- Elevation: 30 m (98 ft)
- Highest elevation: 88 m (289 ft)
- Lowest elevation: 26 m (85 ft)
- Population (2023): 347
  - Density: 24.3/km^{2} (62.8/sq mi)
- Time zone: UTC+01:00 (CET)
  - Summer (DST): UTC+02:00 (CEST)
- INSEE/Postal code: 17234 /17330
- ^{1} French Land Register data, which excludes lakes, ponds, glaciers > 1 km^{2} (0.386 sq mi or 247 acres) and river estuaries.

Migré (French pronunciation: [miɡʁe]) is a commune in the Charente-Maritime department in southwestern France.

== Population ==
Historical population
Year	Pop.	±% p.a.
1968	480	—
1975	406	−2.36%
1982	338	−2.58%
1990	329	−0.34%
1999	320	−0.31%
2007	335	+0.57%
2012	326	−0.54%
2017	331	+0.30%
2023	347	+0.79%
Source: INSEE

== See also ==
- Communes of the Charente-Maritime department
