= Vergné =

- Commune
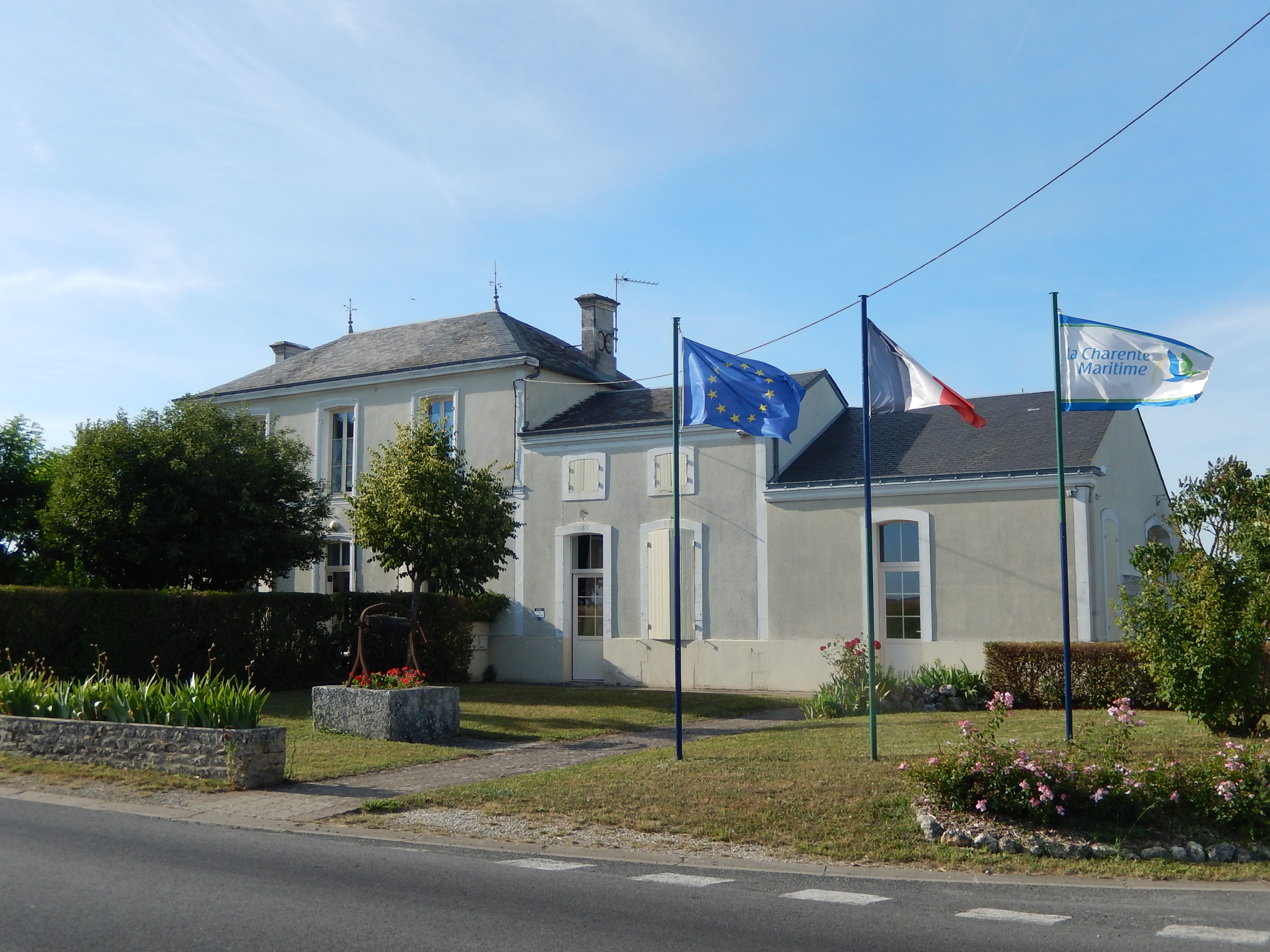
- The town hall in Vergné
- Location of Vergné
- Location within France Location within Nouvelle-Aquitaine
- Coordinates: 46°04′26″N 0°31′09″W
- Country: France
- Region: Nouvelle-Aquitaine
- Department: Charente-Maritime
- Arrondissement: Saint-Jean-d'Angély
- Canton: Saint-Jean-d'Angély
- Intercommunality: Vals de Saintonge

Government
  - Mayor (2020–2026): Brigitte David
- Area^{1}: 8 km^{2} (3.1 sq mi)
- Elevation: 49 m (161 ft)
- Highest elevation: 61 m (200 ft)
- Lowest elevation: 31 m (102 ft)
- Population (2023): 172
  - Density: 22/km^{2} (56/sq mi)
- Time zone: UTC+01:00 (CET)
  - Summer (DST): UTC+02:00 (CEST)
- INSEE/Postal code: 17464 /17330
- ^{1} French Land Register data, which excludes lakes, ponds, glaciers > 1 km^{2} (0.386 sq mi or 247 acres) and river estuaries.

Vergné (French pronunciation: [vɛʁɲe]) is a commune in the Charente-Maritime department in southwestern France.

== Population ==
Historical population
Year	Pop.	±% p.a.
1968	177	—
1975	149	−2.43%
1982	169	+1.82%
1990	174	+0.37%
1999	168	−0.39%
2007	151	−1.32%
2012	142	−1.22%
2017	138	−0.57%
2023	172	+3.74%
Source: INSEE

== See also ==
- Communes of the Charente-Maritime department
