= Courant, Charente-Maritime =

Courant
- Commune
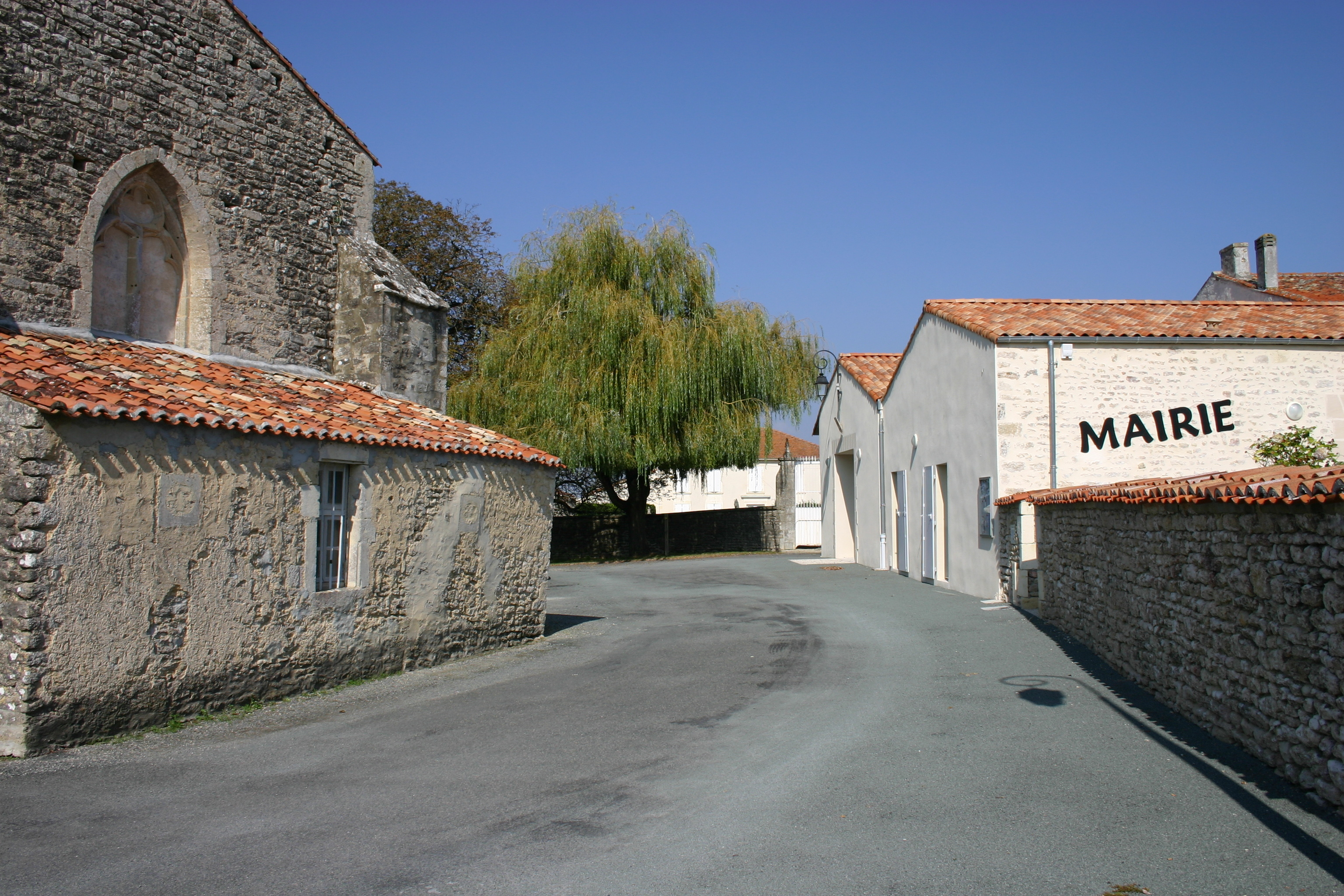
- The town hall in Courant
- Location of Courant
- Location within France Location within Nouvelle-Aquitaine
- Coordinates: 46°02′35″N 0°34′21″W
- Country: France
- Region: Nouvelle-Aquitaine
- Department: Charente-Maritime
- Arrondissement: Saint-Jean-d'Angély
- Canton: Saint-Jean-d'Angély

Government
  - Mayor (2020–2026): Roland Nazet
- Area^{1}: 15.46 km^{2} (5.97 sq mi)
- Highest elevation: 99 m (325 ft)
- Lowest elevation: 12 m (39 ft)
- Population (2023): 445
  - Density: 28.8/km^{2} (74.6/sq mi)
- Time zone: UTC+01:00 (CET)
  - Summer (DST): UTC+02:00 (CEST)
- INSEE/Postal code: 17124 /17330
- ^{1} French Land Register data, which excludes lakes, ponds, glaciers > 1 km^{2} (0.386 sq mi or 247 acres) and river estuaries.

Courant (French pronunciation: [kuʁɑ̃]) is a commune in the Charente-Maritime department in southwestern France.

== Population ==
Historical population
Year	Pop.	±% p.a.
1968	423	—
1975	349	−2.71%
1982	329	−0.84%
1990	294	−1.40%
1999	277	−0.66%
2007	345	+2.78%
2012	386	+2.27%
2017	414	+1.41%
2023	445	+1.21%
Source: INSEE

== See also ==
- Communes of the Charente-Maritime department
