= Villeneuve-la-Comtesse =

- Commune
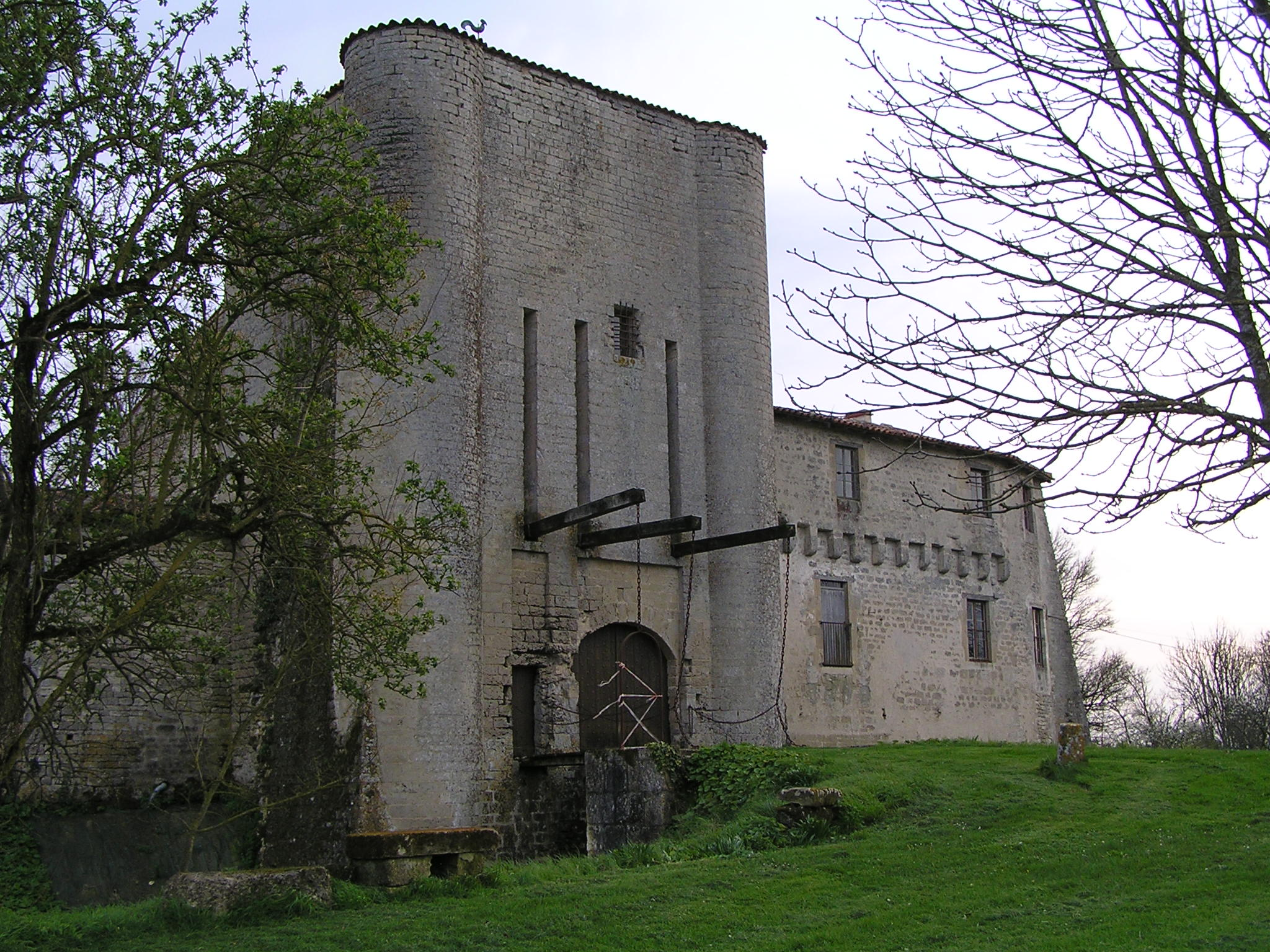
- Chateau
- Location of Villeneuve-la-Comtesse
- Location within France Location within Nouvelle-Aquitaine
- Coordinates: 46°05′57″N 0°30′11″W
- Country: France
- Region: Nouvelle-Aquitaine
- Department: Charente-Maritime
- Arrondissement: Saint-Jean-d'Angély
- Canton: Saint-Jean-d'Angély

Government
  - Mayor (2020–2026): Simone Roy
- Area^{1}: 15.9 km^{2} (6.1 sq mi)
- Highest elevation: 92 m (302 ft)
- Lowest elevation: 43 m (141 ft)
- Population (2023): 743
  - Density: 46.7/km^{2} (121/sq mi)
- Time zone: UTC+01:00 (CET)
  - Summer (DST): UTC+02:00 (CEST)
- INSEE/Postal code: 17474 /17330
- ^{1} French Land Register data, which excludes lakes, ponds, glaciers > 1 km^{2} (0.386 sq mi or 247 acres) and river estuaries.

Villeneuve-la-Comtesse (French pronunciation: [vilnœv la kɔ̃tɛs]) is a commune in the Charente-Maritime department in southwestern France.

== Population ==
Historical population
Year	Pop.	±% p.a.
1968	866	—
1975	858	−0.13%
1982	826	−0.54%
1990	768	−0.91%
1999	719	−0.73%
2007	694	−0.44%
2012	760	+1.83%
2017	741	−0.51%
2023	743	+0.04%
Source: INSEE

== See also ==
- Communes of the Charente-Maritime department
