= La Jarrie-Audouin =

- Commune
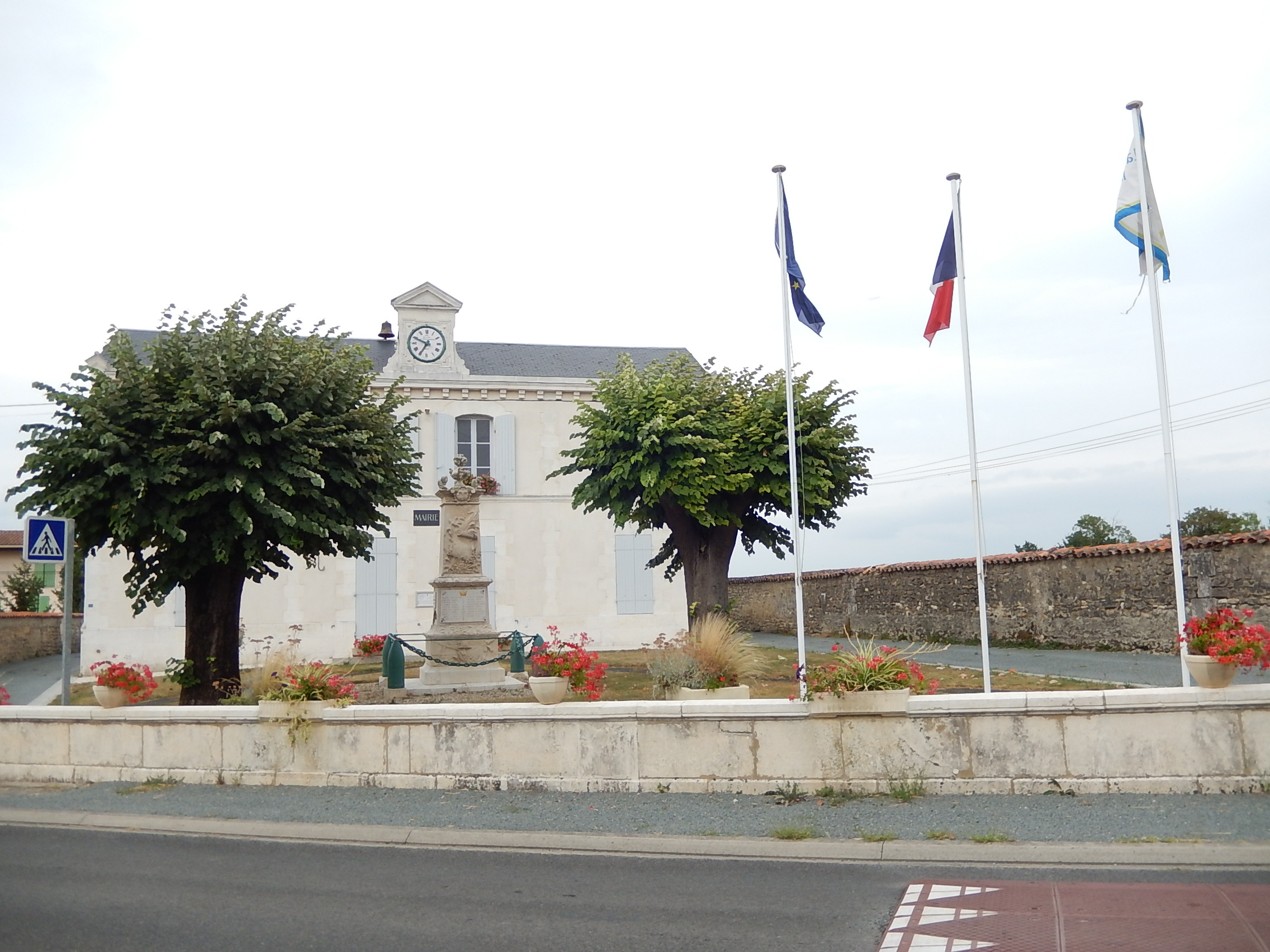
- The town hall in La Jarrie-Audouin

- Coat of arms
- Location of La Jarrie-Audouin
- Location within France Location within Nouvelle-Aquitaine
- Coordinates: 46°01′46″N 0°29′16″W
- Country: France
- Region: Nouvelle-Aquitaine
- Department: Charente-Maritime
- Arrondissement: Saint-Jean-d'Angély
- Canton: Saint-Jean-d'Angély

Government
  - Mayor (2020–2026): Jacky Raud
- Area^{1}: 8.41 km^{2} (3.25 sq mi)
- Highest elevation: 89 m (292 ft)
- Lowest elevation: 34 m (112 ft)
- Population (2023): 270
  - Density: 32/km^{2} (83/sq mi)
- Time zone: UTC+01:00 (CET)
  - Summer (DST): UTC+02:00 (CEST)
- INSEE/Postal code: 17195 /17330
- ^{1} French Land Register data, which excludes lakes, ponds, glaciers > 1 km^{2} (0.386 sq mi or 247 acres) and river estuaries.

La Jarrie-Audouin (French pronunciation: [la ʒaʁi odwɛ̃]) is a commune in the Charente-Maritime department in southwestern France.

== Population ==
Historical population
Year	Pop.	±% p.a.
1968	302	—
1975	269	−1.64%
1982	278	+0.47%
1990	268	−0.46%
1999	272	+0.16%
2007	251	−1.00%
2012	301	+3.70%
2017	265	−2.52%
2023	270	+0.31%
Source: INSEE

== See also ==
- Communes of the Charente-Maritime department
