= Ternant, Charente-Maritime =

Ternant
- Commune
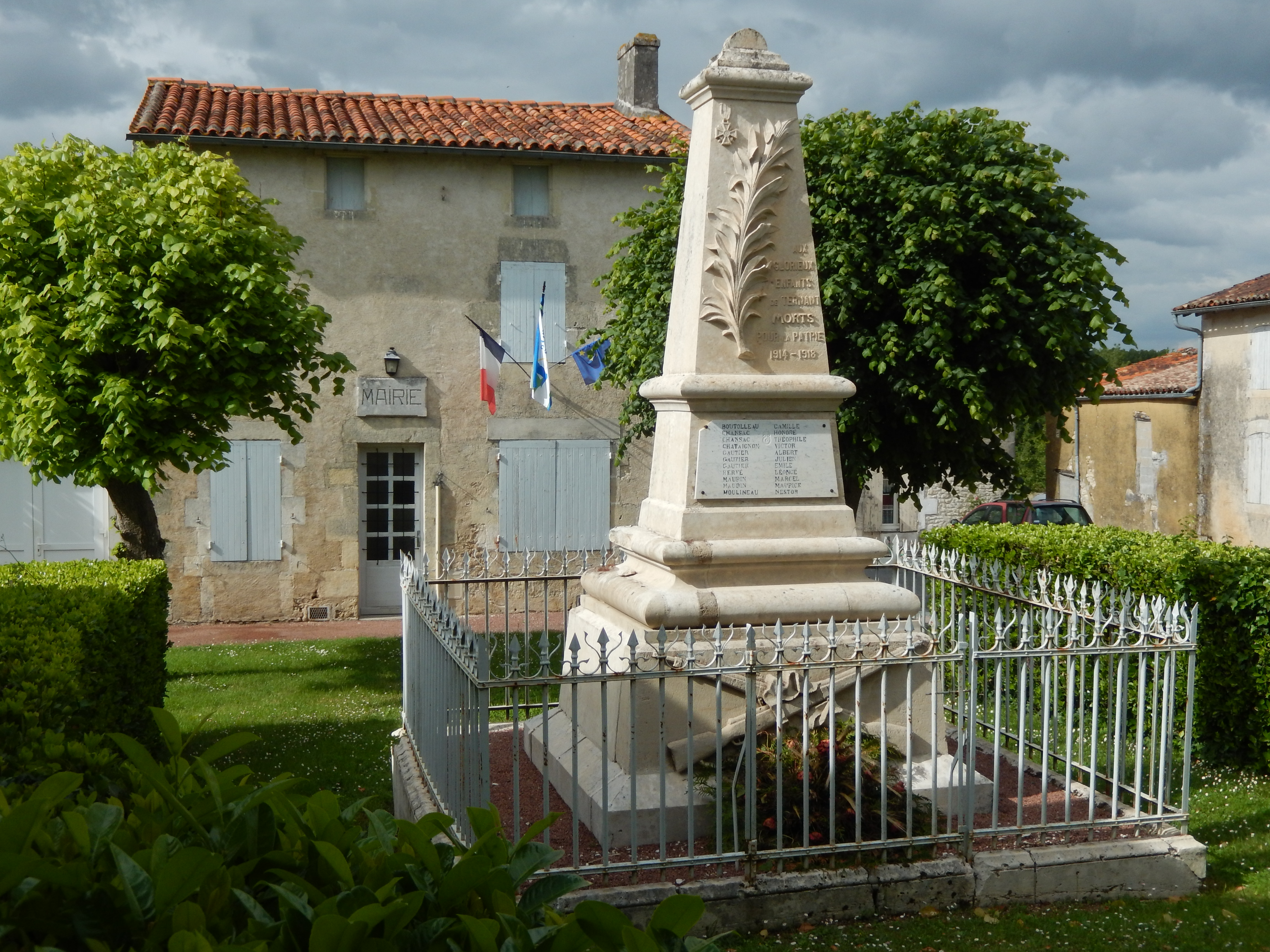
- The town hall in Ternant
- Location of Ternant
- Location within France Location within Nouvelle-Aquitaine
- Coordinates: 45°57′00″N 0°34′23″W
- Country: France
- Region: Nouvelle-Aquitaine
- Department: Charente-Maritime
- Arrondissement: Saint-Jean-d'Angély
- Canton: Saint-Jean-d'Angély

Government
  - Mayor (2020–2026): Didier Daunizeau
- Area^{1}: 5.61 km^{2} (2.17 sq mi)
- Elevation: 25 m (82 ft)
- Highest elevation: 35 m (115 ft)
- Lowest elevation: 5 m (16 ft)
- Population (2023): 385
  - Density: 68.6/km^{2} (178/sq mi)
- Time zone: UTC+01:00 (CET)
  - Summer (DST): UTC+02:00 (CEST)
- INSEE/Postal code: 17440 /17400
- ^{1} French Land Register data, which excludes lakes, ponds, glaciers > 1 km^{2} (0.386 sq mi or 247 acres) and river estuaries.

Ternant (French pronunciation: [tɛʁnɑ̃]) is a commune in the Charente-Maritime department in southwestern France.

== Geography ==
The Boutonne forms all of the commune's northern border.

== Population ==
Historical population
Year	Pop.	±% p.a.
1968	179	—
1975	198	+1.45%
1982	211	+0.91%
1990	215	+0.24%
1999	237	+1.09%
2007	315	+3.62%
2012	370	+3.27%
2017	379	+0.48%
2023	385	+0.26%
Source: INSEE

== Politics ==
Terrenas is a representative of the provincial electoral district of Saint-Jean-d'Angély.

== See also ==
- Communes of the Charente-Maritime department
