= Brie-sous-Matha =

- Commune
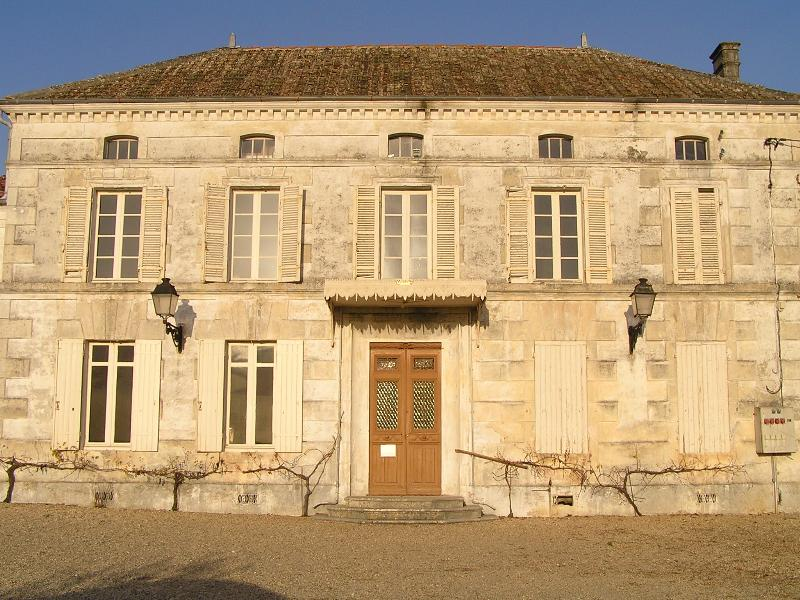
- The town hall in Brie-sous-Matha
- Location of Brie-sous-Matha
- Location within France Location within Nouvelle-Aquitaine
- Coordinates: 45°49′12″N 0°14′57″W
- Country: France
- Region: Nouvelle-Aquitaine
- Department: Charente-Maritime
- Arrondissement: Saint-Jean-d'Angély
- Canton: Matha

Government
  - Mayor (2020–2026): Bernard Goursaud
- Area^{1}: 6.3 km^{2} (2.4 sq mi)
- Elevation: 48 m (157 ft)
- Highest elevation: 73 m (240 ft)
- Lowest elevation: 21 m (69 ft)
- Population (2023): 163
  - Density: 26/km^{2} (67/sq mi)
- Time zone: UTC+01:00 (CET)
  - Summer (DST): UTC+02:00 (CEST)
- INSEE/Postal code: 17067 /17160
- ^{1} French Land Register data, which excludes lakes, ponds, glaciers > 1 km^{2} (0.386 sq mi or 247 acres) and river estuaries.

Brie-sous-Matha (French pronunciation: [bʁi su mata], literally Brie under Matha) is a commune in the Charente-Maritime department in the Nouvelle-Aquitaine region in southwestern France.

== Population ==
Historical population
Year	Pop.	±% p.a.
1968	229	—
1975	209	−1.30%
1982	197	−0.84%
1990	178	−1.26%
1999	176	−0.13%
2007	190	+0.96%
2012	199	+0.93%
2017	179	−2.10%
2023	163	−1.55%
Source: INSEE

== See also ==
- Communes of the Charente-Maritime department
