= Beauvais-sur-Matha =

- Commune
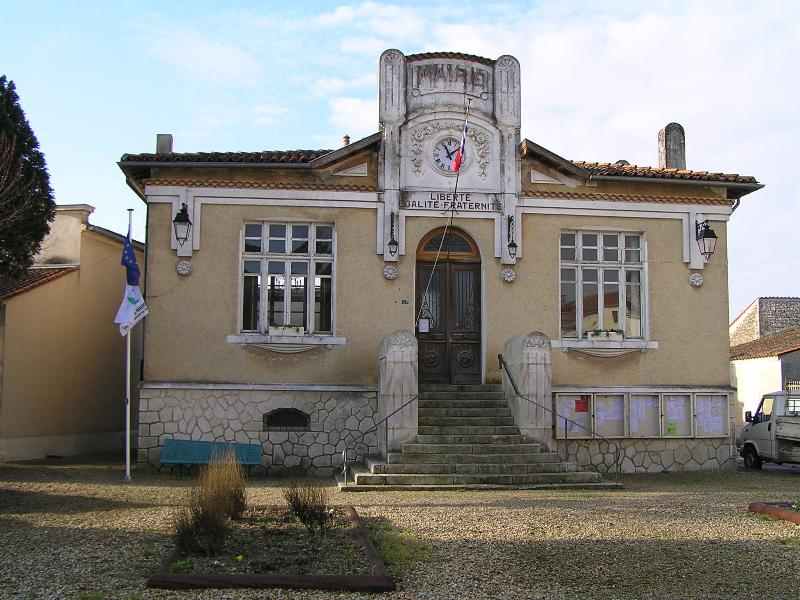
- Town hall
- Location of Beauvais-sur-Matha
- Location within France Location within Nouvelle-Aquitaine
- Coordinates: 45°52′57″N 0°11′12″W
- Country: France
- Region: Nouvelle-Aquitaine
- Department: Charente-Maritime
- Arrondissement: Saint-Jean-d'Angély
- Canton: Matha

Government
  - Mayor (2020–2026): Hubert Coupez
- Area^{1}: 12.48 km^{2} (4.82 sq mi)
- Elevation: 135 m (443 ft)
- Highest elevation: 132 m (433 ft)
- Lowest elevation: 75 m (246 ft)
- Population (2023): 638
  - Density: 51.1/km^{2} (132/sq mi)
- Time zone: UTC+01:00 (CET)
  - Summer (DST): UTC+02:00 (CEST)
- INSEE/Postal code: 17037 /17490
- ^{1} French Land Register data, which excludes lakes, ponds, glaciers > 1 km^{2} (0.386 sq mi or 247 acres) and river estuaries.

Beauvais-sur-Matha (French pronunciation: [bovɛ syʁ mata], literally Beauvais on Matha) is a commune in the Charente-Maritime department in the Nouvelle-Aquitaine region in southwestern France.

== Population ==
Historical population
Year	Pop.	±% p.a.
1968	667	—
1975	715	+1.00%
1982	691	−0.49%
1990	645	−0.86%
1999	619	−0.46%
2007	693	+1.42%
2012	672	−0.61%
2017	635	−1.13%
2023	638	+0.08%
Source: INSEE

== See also ==
- Communes of the Charente-Maritime department
