= Saint-Félix, Charente-Maritime =

Saint-Félix
- Commune
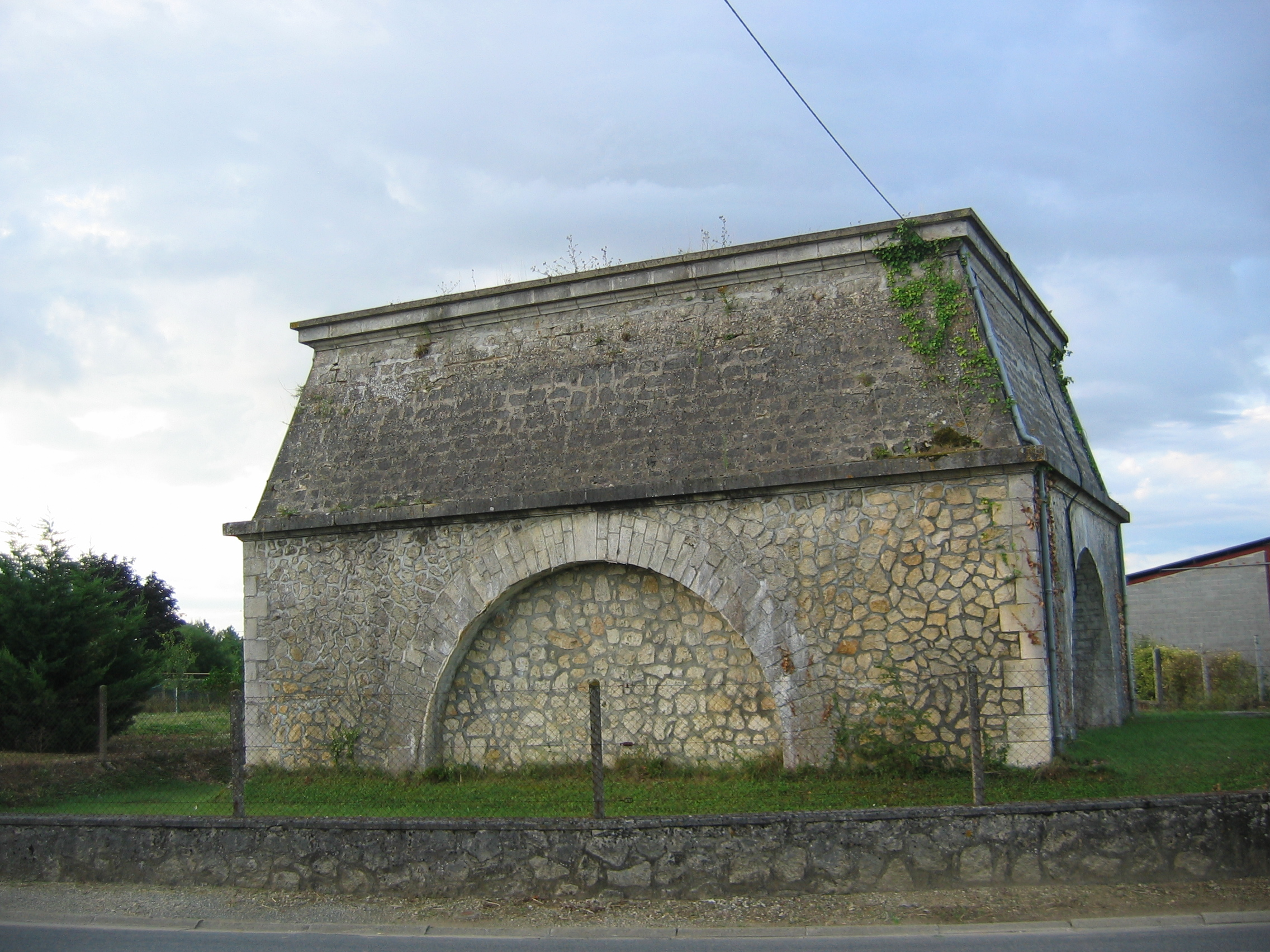
- Water tower
- Location of Saint-Félix
- Location within France Location within Nouvelle-Aquitaine
- Coordinates: 46°05′24″N 0°35′55″W
- Country: France
- Region: Nouvelle-Aquitaine
- Department: Charente-Maritime
- Arrondissement: Saint-Jean-d'Angély
- Canton: Saint-Jean-d'Angély
- Intercommunality: Vals de Saintonge

Government
  - Mayor (2020–2026): Dominique Seyfried
- Area^{1}: 15.23 km^{2} (5.88 sq mi)
- Elevation: 80 m (260 ft)
- Highest elevation: 90 m (300 ft)
- Lowest elevation: 37 m (121 ft)
- Population (2023): 324
  - Density: 21.3/km^{2} (55.1/sq mi)
- Time zone: UTC+01:00 (CET)
  - Summer (DST): UTC+02:00 (CEST)
- INSEE/Postal code: 17327 /17330
- ^{1} French Land Register data, which excludes lakes, ponds, glaciers > 1 km^{2} (0.386 sq mi or 247 acres) and river estuaries.

Saint-Félix is a commune in the Charente-Maritime department in southwestern France.

== Population ==
Historical population
Year	Pop.	±% p.a.
1968	331	—
1975	289	−1.92%
1982	273	−0.81%
1990	253	−0.95%
1999	282	+1.21%
2007	289	+0.31%
2012	301	+0.82%
2017	299	−0.13%
2023	324	+1.35%
Source: INSEE

== See also ==
- Communes of the Charente-Maritime department
