= Puyrolland =

- Commune
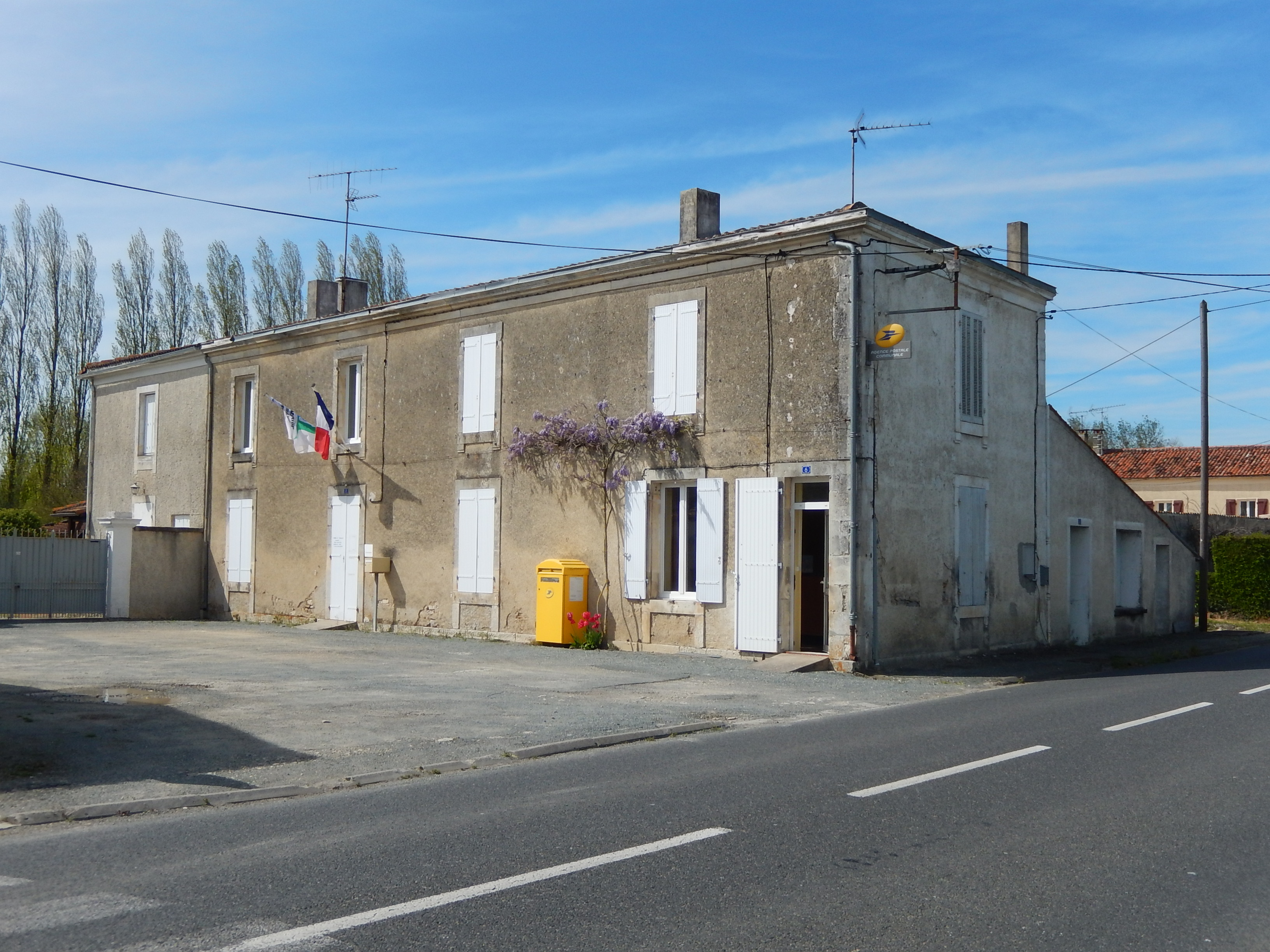
- The town hall in Puyrolland
- Location of Puyrolland
- Location within France Location within Nouvelle-Aquitaine
- Coordinates: 46°02′24″N 0°37′41″W
- Country: France
- Region: Nouvelle-Aquitaine
- Department: Charente-Maritime
- Arrondissement: Saint-Jean-d'Angély
- Canton: Saint-Jean-d'Angély

Government
  - Mayor (2020–2026): Thierry Giraud
- Area^{1}: 12.98 km^{2} (5.01 sq mi)
- Elevation: 45 m (148 ft)
- Highest elevation: 55 m (180 ft)
- Lowest elevation: 2 m (6.6 ft)
- Population (2023): 182
  - Density: 14.0/km^{2} (36.3/sq mi)
- Time zone: UTC+01:00 (CET)
  - Summer (DST): UTC+02:00 (CEST)
- INSEE/Postal code: 17294 /17380
- ^{1} French Land Register data, which excludes lakes, ponds, glaciers > 1 km^{2} (0.386 sq mi or 247 acres) and river estuaries.

Puyrolland (French pronunciation: [pɥiʁɔlɑ̃]) is a commune in the Charente-Maritime department in the Nouvelle-Aquitaine region in southwestern France.

== Neighboring commune ==
- Chervettes

== Population ==
Historical population
Year	Pop.	±% p.a.
1968	245	—
1975	246	+0.06%
1982	198	−3.05%
1990	209	+0.68%
1999	193	−0.88%
2007	207	+0.88%
2012	188	−1.91%
2017	201	+1.35%
2023	182	−1.64%
Source: INSEE

== See also ==
- Communes of the Charente-Maritime department
