= La Croix-Comtesse =

- Commune
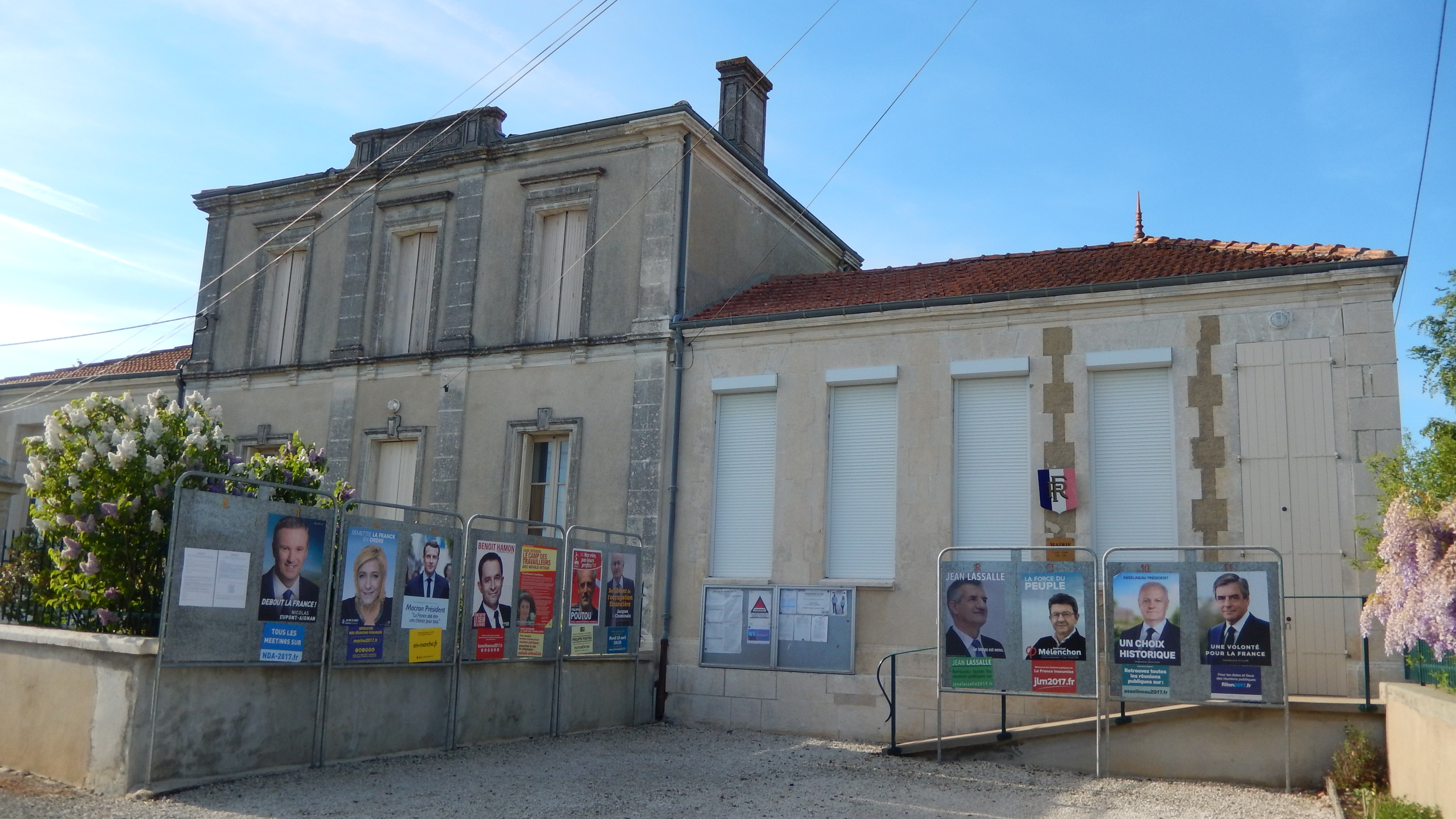
- The town hall in La Croix-Comtesse
- Location of La Croix-Comtesse
- Location within France Location within Nouvelle-Aquitaine
- Coordinates: 46°04′41″N 0°29′40″W
- Country: France
- Region: Nouvelle-Aquitaine
- Department: Charente-Maritime
- Arrondissement: Saint-Jean-d'Angély
- Canton: Saint-Jean-d'Angély

Government
  - Mayor (2020–2026): Jacques Roux
- Area^{1}: 2.62 km^{2} (1.01 sq mi)
- Highest elevation: 60 m (200 ft)
- Lowest elevation: 41 m (135 ft)
- Population (2023): 223
  - Density: 85.1/km^{2} (220/sq mi)
- Time zone: UTC+01:00 (CET)
  - Summer (DST): UTC+02:00 (CEST)
- INSEE/Postal code: 17137 /17330
- ^{1} French Land Register data, which excludes lakes, ponds, glaciers > 1 km^{2} (0.386 sq mi or 247 acres) and river estuaries.

La Croix-Comtesse (French pronunciation: [la kʁwa kɔ̃tɛs]) is a commune in the Charente-Maritime department in southwestern France.

== Population ==
Historical population
Year	Pop.	±% p.a.
1968	207	—
1975	189	−1.29%
1982	189	+0.00%
1990	161	−1.98%
1999	172	+0.74%
2007	170	−0.15%
2012	228	+6.05%
2017	223	−0.44%
2023	223	+0.00%
Source: INSEE

== See also ==
- Communes of the Charente-Maritime department
