= Saint-Loup, Charente-Maritime =

Saint-Loup
- Commune
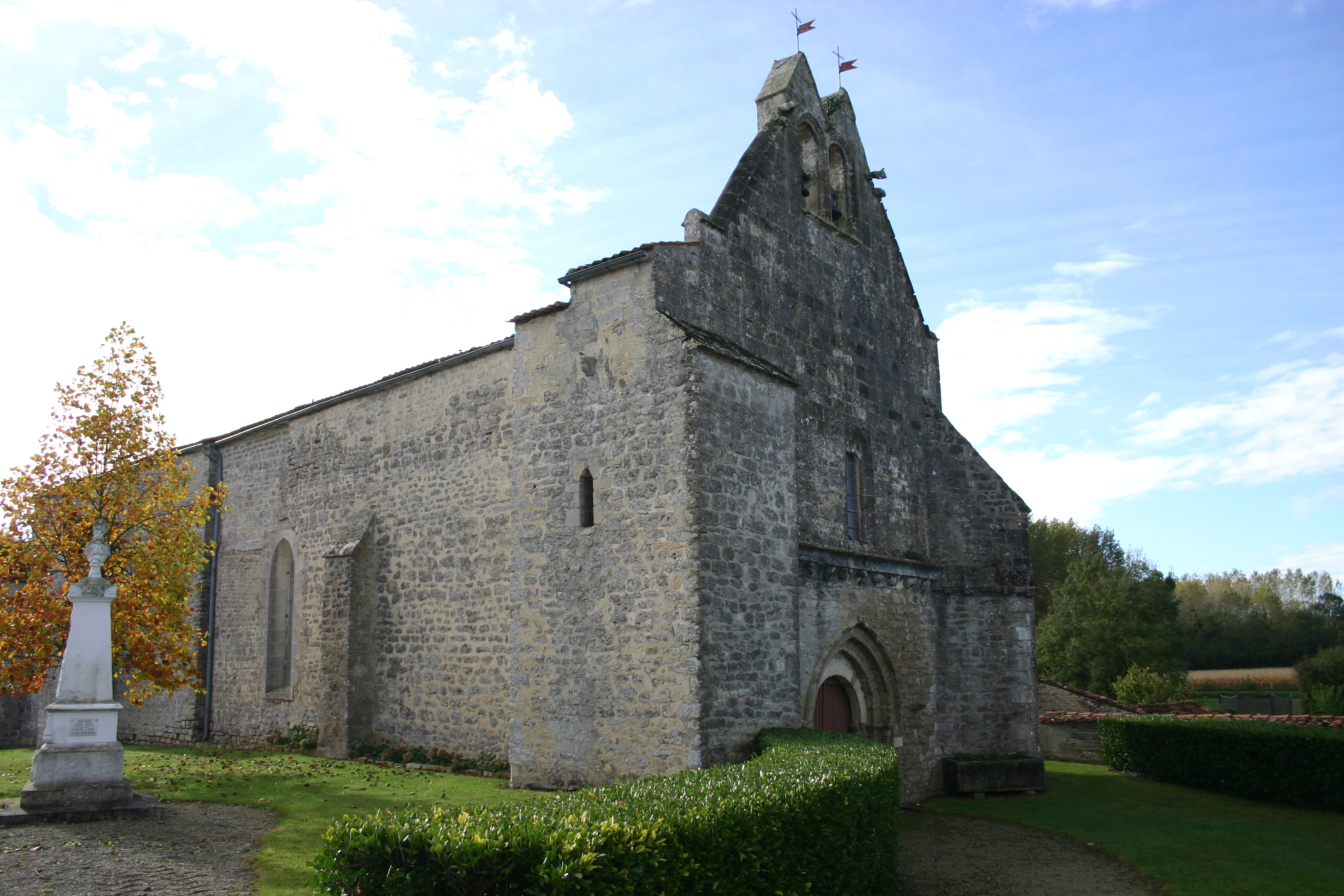
- The church in Saint-Loup
- Location of Saint-Loup
- Location within France Location within Nouvelle-Aquitaine
- Coordinates: 46°00′00″N 0°37′26″W
- Country: France
- Region: Nouvelle-Aquitaine
- Department: Charente-Maritime
- Arrondissement: Saint-Jean-d'Angély
- Canton: Saint-Jean-d'Angély

Government
  - Mayor (2020–2026): Renée Bonneau
- Area^{1}: 16.42 km^{2} (6.34 sq mi)
- Highest elevation: 48 m (157 ft)
- Lowest elevation: 2 m (6.6 ft)
- Population (2023): 313
  - Density: 19.1/km^{2} (49.4/sq mi)
- Time zone: UTC+01:00 (CET)
  - Summer (DST): UTC+02:00 (CEST)
- INSEE/Postal code: 17356 /17380
- ^{1} French Land Register data, which excludes lakes, ponds, glaciers > 1 km^{2} (0.386 sq mi or 247 acres) and river estuaries.

Saint-Loup (French pronunciation: [sɛ̃ lu]) is a commune in the Charente-Maritime department in the Nouvelle-Aquitaine region in southwestern France.

== Geography ==
It became a commune in 1642 and comprises 21 hamlets. The area of Saint-Loup are marshy. The village lies on the stream Bibot, which empties into the Soie (Charente basin). Most of the area is devoted to agriculture including corn, cattle, and wine.

== Life of the commune ==
The local football (soccer) club was founded in 1936 under the name AS Trézence.

In late August, it organizes tours of roads and passages of the commune.

One of its culinary specialties is grilled ham.

The commune has migratory birds along with hibernal ones including ducks and waders.

== History ==
The commune participated in the French Revolution of 1789. Its inhabitants rallied and engaged against the nobles of the village. It was renamed Épinay-Sans-Culotte (see sans-culotte). The extension Saintonge marked the beginning of the commune to the north of Saintonge by the Aunis frontiers by Santiago de Compostela.

The swamplands were drained and farmlands expanded during the reign of Louis XIV. The area produces livestock including cows, beans and corn. Its seasons are from October/December to February/April.

Local people have traditionally been winemakers. The village was affected by phylloxera in the 1860s. It marked the period by agricultural expansion in the marshlands and pasture.

== Population ==
Historical population
| Year | Pop. | ±% p.a. |
|---|---|---|
| 1968 | 327 | — |
| 1975 | 267 | −2.85% |
| 1982 | 252 | −0.82% |
| 1990 | 274 | +1.05% |
| 1999 | 273 | −0.04% |
| 2007 | 270 | −0.14% |
| 2012 | 315 | +3.13% |
| 2017 | 303 | −0.77% |
| 2023 | 313 | +0.54% |
Source: INSEE

== See also ==
- Communes of the Charente-Maritime department
