= Mazeray =

- Commune
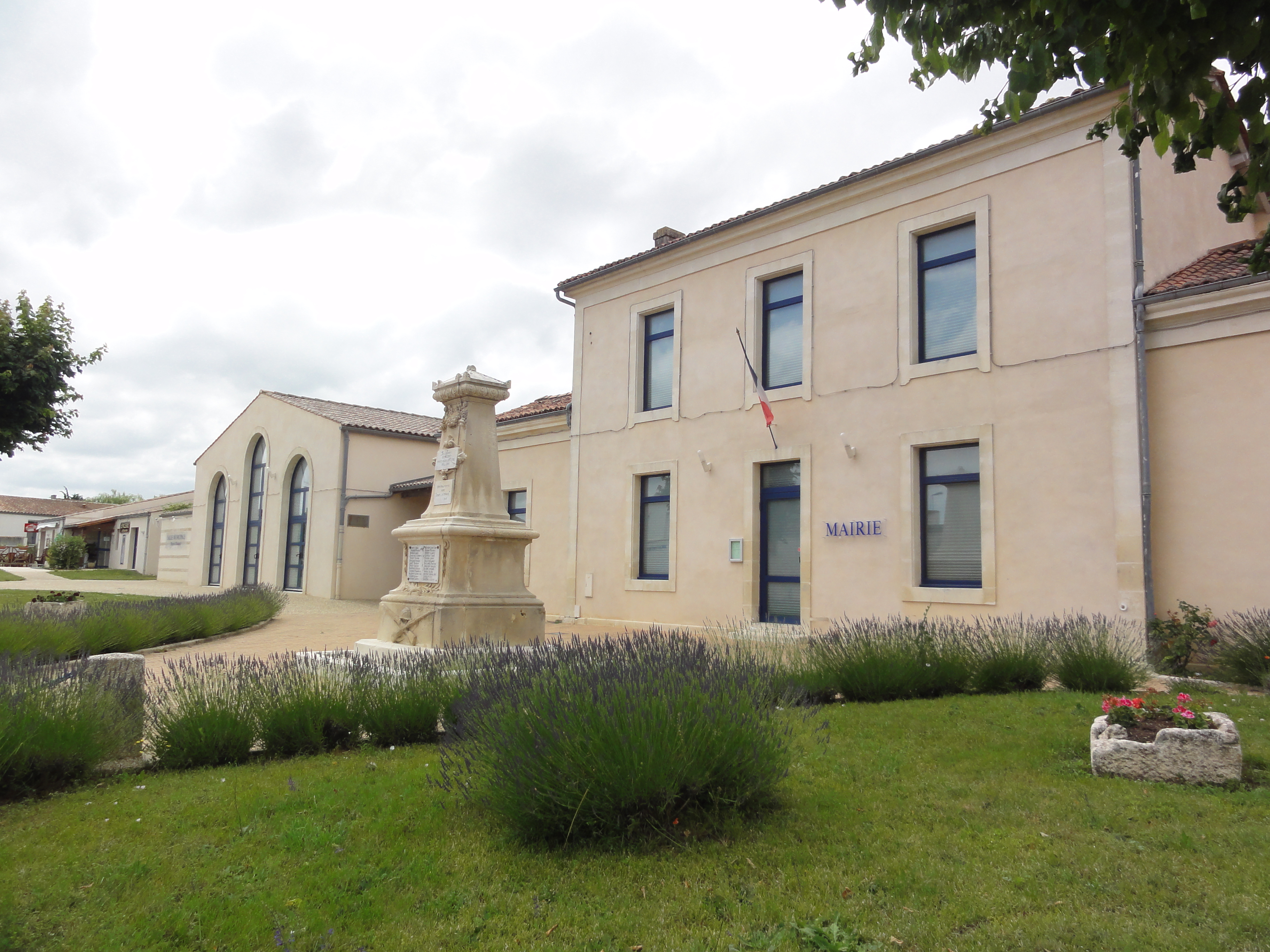
- The town hall and war memorial in Mazeray
- Location of Mazeray
- Location within France Location within Nouvelle-Aquitaine
- Coordinates: 45°54′30″N 0°33′49″W
- Country: France
- Region: Nouvelle-Aquitaine
- Department: Charente-Maritime
- Arrondissement: Saint-Jean-d'Angély
- Canton: Saint-Jean-d'Angély
- Intercommunality: Vals de Saintonge

Government
  - Mayor (2020–2026): Sylvain Marchal
- Area^{1}: 19.38 km^{2} (7.48 sq mi)
- Elevation: 69 m (226 ft)
- Highest elevation: 101 m (331 ft)
- Lowest elevation: 15 m (49 ft)
- Population (2023): 991
  - Density: 51.1/km^{2} (132/sq mi)
- Time zone: UTC+01:00 (CET)
  - Summer (DST): UTC+02:00 (CEST)
- INSEE/Postal code: 17226 /17400
- ^{1} French Land Register data, which excludes lakes, ponds, glaciers > 1 km^{2} (0.386 sq mi or 247 acres) and river estuaries.

Mazeray (French pronunciation: [mazʁɛ]) is a commune in the Charente-Maritime department in southwestern France.

== See also ==
- Communes of the Charente-Maritime department
