= Bignay, Charente-Maritime =

Bignay
- Commune
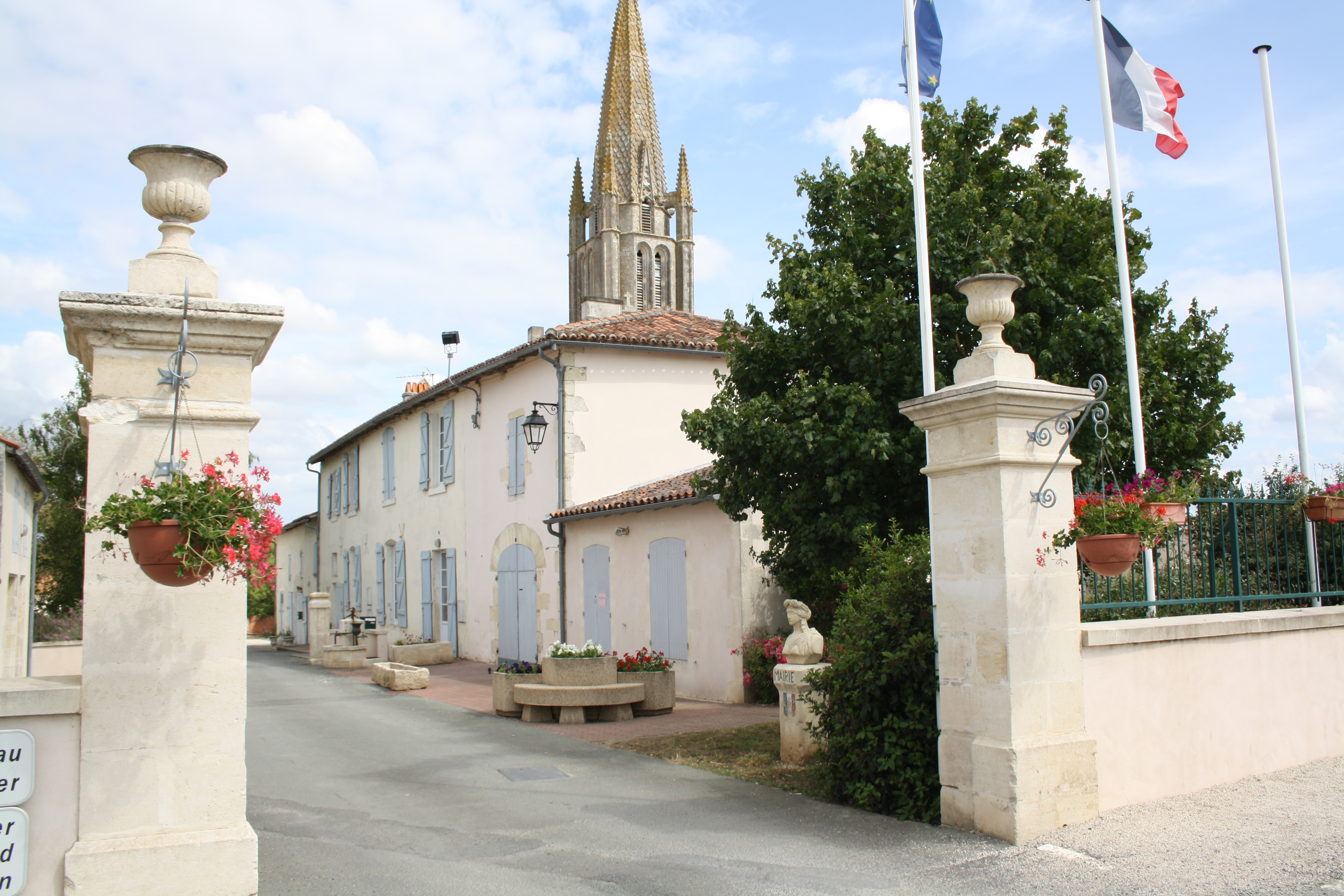
- The town hall in Bignay
- Location of Bignay
- Location within France Location within Nouvelle-Aquitaine
- Coordinates: 45°55′01″N 0°36′00″W
- Country: France
- Region: Nouvelle-Aquitaine
- Department: Charente-Maritime
- Arrondissement: Saint-Jean-d'Angély
- Canton: Saint-Jean-d'Angély
- Intercommunality: Vals de Saintonge

Government
  - Mayor (2020–2026): Alain Mège
- Area^{1}: 8.73 km^{2} (3.37 sq mi)
- Elevation: 37 m (121 ft)
- Highest elevation: 86 m (282 ft)
- Lowest elevation: 14 m (46 ft)
- Population (2023): 359
  - Density: 41.1/km^{2} (107/sq mi)
- Time zone: UTC+01:00 (CET)
  - Summer (DST): UTC+02:00 (CEST)
- INSEE/Postal code: 17046 /17400
- ^{1} French Land Register data, which excludes lakes, ponds, glaciers > 1 km^{2} (0.386 sq mi or 247 acres) and river estuaries.

Bignay (French pronunciation: [biɲɛ]) is a commune in the Charente-Maritime department in southwestern France.

== Population ==
Historical population
Year	Pop.	±% p.a.
1968	237	—
1975	194	−2.82%
1982	244	+3.33%
1990	312	+3.12%
1999	321	+0.32%
2007	395	+2.63%
2012	445	+2.41%
2017	411	−1.58%
2023	359	−2.23%
Source: INSEE

== See also ==
- Communes of the Charente-Maritime department
