= Voissay =

- Commune
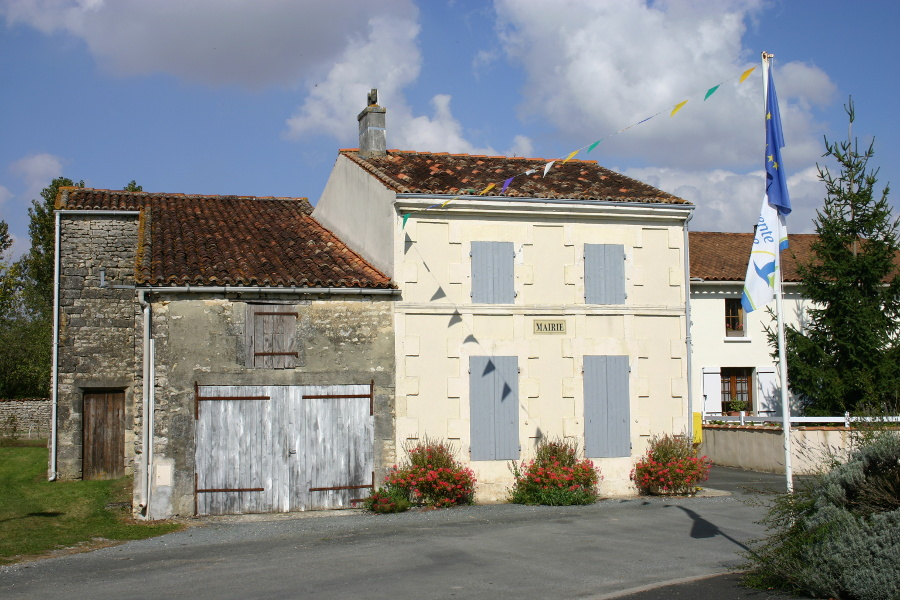
- The town hall in Voissay
- Location of Voissay
- Location within France Location within Nouvelle-Aquitaine
- Coordinates: 45°57′11″N 0°36′15″W
- Country: France
- Region: Nouvelle-Aquitaine
- Department: Charente-Maritime
- Arrondissement: Saint-Jean-d'Angély
- Canton: Saint-Jean-d'Angély
- Intercommunality: Vals de Saintonge

Government
  - Mayor (2020–2026): Marina Gallois
- Area^{1}: 5.06 km^{2} (1.95 sq mi)
- Elevation: 8 m (26 ft)
- Highest elevation: 45 m (148 ft)
- Lowest elevation: 3 m (9.8 ft)
- Population (2023): 173
  - Density: 34.2/km^{2} (88.6/sq mi)
- Time zone: UTC+01:00 (CET)
  - Summer (DST): UTC+02:00 (CEST)
- INSEE/Postal code: 17481 /17400
- ^{1} French Land Register data, which excludes lakes, ponds, glaciers > 1 km^{2} (0.386 sq mi or 247 acres) and river estuaries.

Voissay (French pronunciation: [vwasɛ]) is a commune in the Charente-Maritime department in southwestern France.

== Geography ==
The river Boutonne forms all of the commune's northern border.

== Population ==
Historical population
Year	Pop.	±% p.a.
1968	130	—
1975	119	−1.26%
1982	123	+0.47%
1990	98	−2.80%
1999	106	+0.88%
2007	148	+4.26%
2012	182	+4.22%
2017	156	−3.04%
2023	173	+1.74%
Source: INSEE

== See also ==
- Communes of the Charente-Maritime department
