= Chantemerle-sur-la-Soie =

- Commune
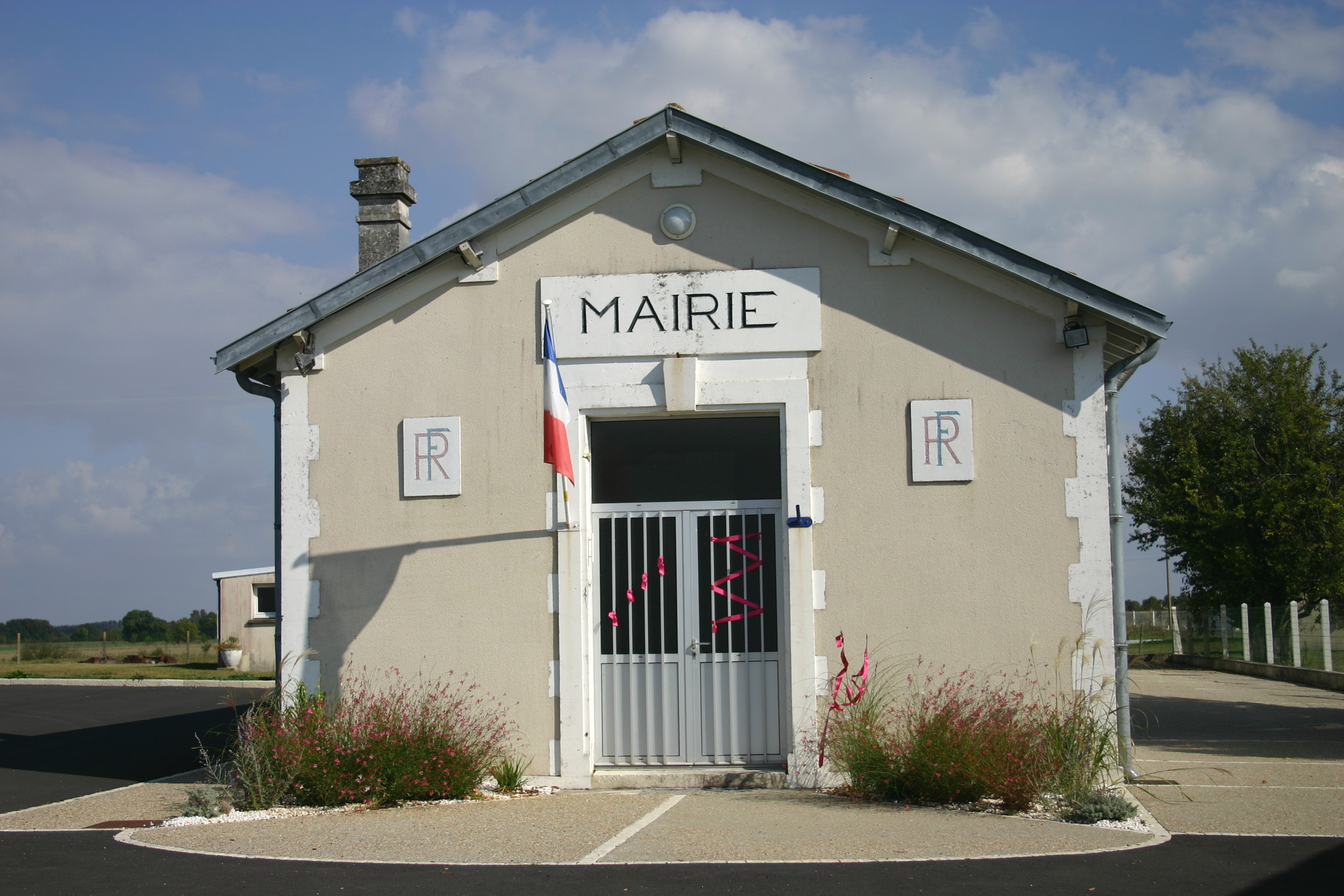
- The town hall in Chantemerle-sur-la-Soie
- Location of Chantemerle-sur-la-Soie
- Location within France Location within Nouvelle-Aquitaine
- Coordinates: 45°58′50″N 0°38′30″W
- Country: France
- Region: Nouvelle-Aquitaine
- Department: Charente-Maritime
- Arrondissement: Saint-Jean-d'Angély
- Canton: Saint-Jean-d'Angély

Government
  - Mayor (2020–2026): Danièle Peraud
- Area^{1}: 5.72 km^{2} (2.21 sq mi)
- Elevation: 11 m (36 ft)
- Highest elevation: 64 m (210 ft)
- Lowest elevation: 2 m (6.6 ft)
- Population (2023): 209
  - Density: 36.5/km^{2} (94.6/sq mi)
- Time zone: UTC+01:00 (CET)
  - Summer (DST): UTC+02:00 (CEST)
- INSEE/Postal code: 17087 /17380
- ^{1} French Land Register data, which excludes lakes, ponds, glaciers > 1 km^{2} (0.386 sq mi or 247 acres) and river estuaries.

Chantemerle-sur-la-Soie is a commune in the Charente-Maritime department in the Nouvelle-Aquitaine region in southwestern France.

== Population ==
Historical population
Year	Pop.	±% p.a.
1968	111	—
1975	114	+0.38%
1982	108	−0.77%
1990	100	−0.96%
1999	108	+0.86%
2007	119	+1.22%
2012	152	+5.02%
2017	185	+4.01%
2023	209	+2.05%
Source: INSEE

== See also ==
- Communes of the Charente-Maritime department
