= Landes, Charente-Maritime =

Landes
- Commune
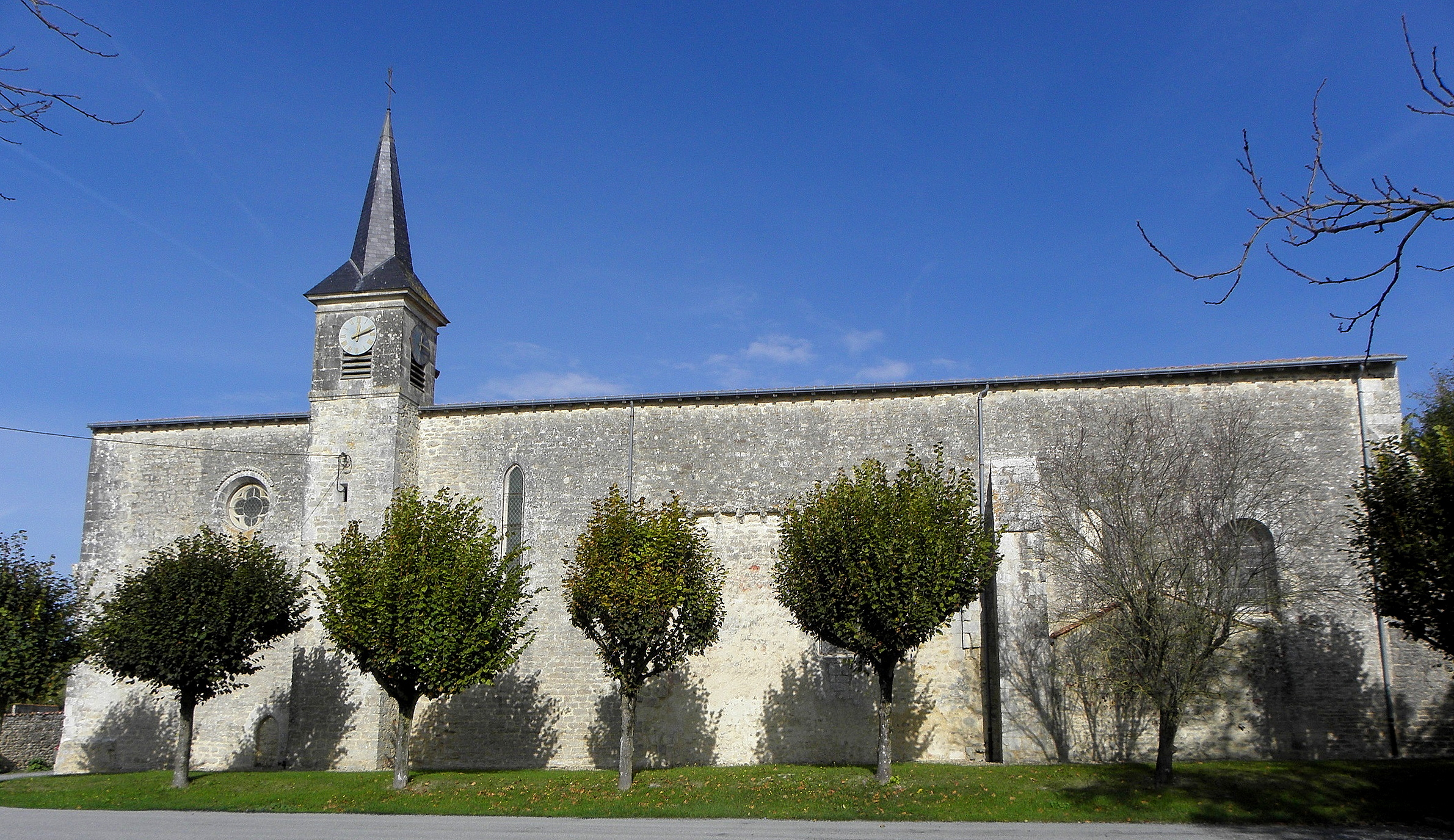
- The church in Landes
- Location of Landes
- Location within France Location within Nouvelle-Aquitaine
- Coordinates: 45°59′35″N 0°35′47″W
- Country: France
- Region: Nouvelle-Aquitaine
- Department: Charente-Maritime
- Arrondissement: Saint-Jean-d'Angély
- Canton: Saint-Jean-d'Angély

Government
  - Mayor (2020–2026): Michel Pelletier
- Area^{1}: 16.05 km^{2} (6.20 sq mi)
- Highest elevation: 76 m (249 ft)
- Lowest elevation: 6 m (20 ft)
- Population (2023): 575
  - Density: 35.8/km^{2} (92.8/sq mi)
- Time zone: UTC+01:00 (CET)
  - Summer (DST): UTC+02:00 (CEST)
- INSEE/Postal code: 17202 /17380
- ^{1} French Land Register data, which excludes lakes, ponds, glaciers > 1 km^{2} (0.386 sq mi or 247 acres) and river estuaries.

Landes (French pronunciation: [lɑ̃d]) is a commune in the Charente-Maritime department in southwestern France.

== Population ==
Historical population
Year	Pop.	±% p.a.
1968	522	—
1975	513	−0.25%
1982	505	−0.22%
1990	527	+0.53%
1999	524	−0.06%
2007	550	+0.61%
2012	610	+2.09%
2017	611	+0.03%
2023	575	−1.01%
Source: INSEE

== See also ==
- Communes of the Charente-Maritime department
