= La Vergne, Charente-Maritime =

La Vergne
- Commune
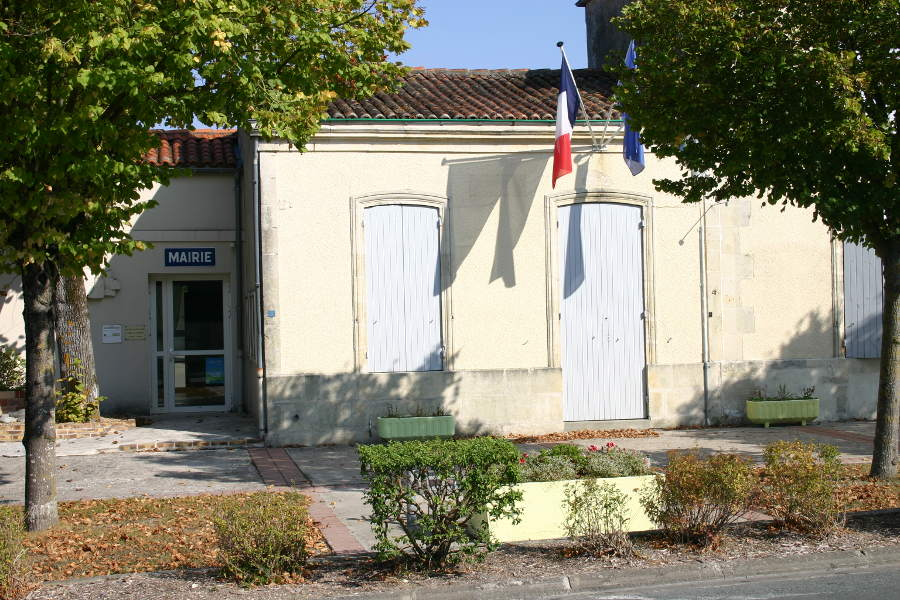
- The town hall in La Vergne

- Coat of arms
- Location of La Vergne
- Location within France Location within Nouvelle-Aquitaine
- Coordinates: 45°57′47″N 0°33′48″W
- Country: France
- Region: Nouvelle-Aquitaine
- Department: Charente-Maritime
- Arrondissement: Saint-Jean-d'Angély
- Canton: Saint-Jean-d'Angély
- Intercommunality: Vals de Saintonge

Government
  - Mayor (2020–2026): Alain Ingrand
- Area^{1}: 13.97 km^{2} (5.39 sq mi)
- Elevation: 12 m (39 ft)
- Highest elevation: 74 m (243 ft)
- Lowest elevation: 5 m (16 ft)
- Population (2023): 611
  - Density: 43.7/km^{2} (113/sq mi)
- Demonym(s): Vergnaud, Vergnaude
- Time zone: UTC+01:00 (CET)
  - Summer (DST): UTC+02:00 (CEST)
- INSEE/Postal code: 17465 /17400
- ^{1} French Land Register data, which excludes lakes, ponds, glaciers > 1 km^{2} (0.386 sq mi or 247 acres) and river estuaries.

La Vergne (French pronunciation: [la vɛʁɲ]) is a commune in the department of Charente-Maritime in the region of Nouvelle-Aquitaine, southwestern France.

== Population ==
Historical population
Year	Pop.	±% p.a.
1968	548	—
1975	526	−0.58%
1982	479	−1.33%
1990	591	+2.66%
1999	569	−0.42%
2007	653	+1.74%
2012	605	−1.52%
2017	585	−0.67%
2023	611	+0.73%
Source: INSEE

== Geography ==
The river Boutonne forms all of the commune's southern border.

== See also ==
- Communes of the Charente-Maritime department
