= Dœuil-sur-le-Mignon =

Doeuil-sur-le-Mignon
- Commune
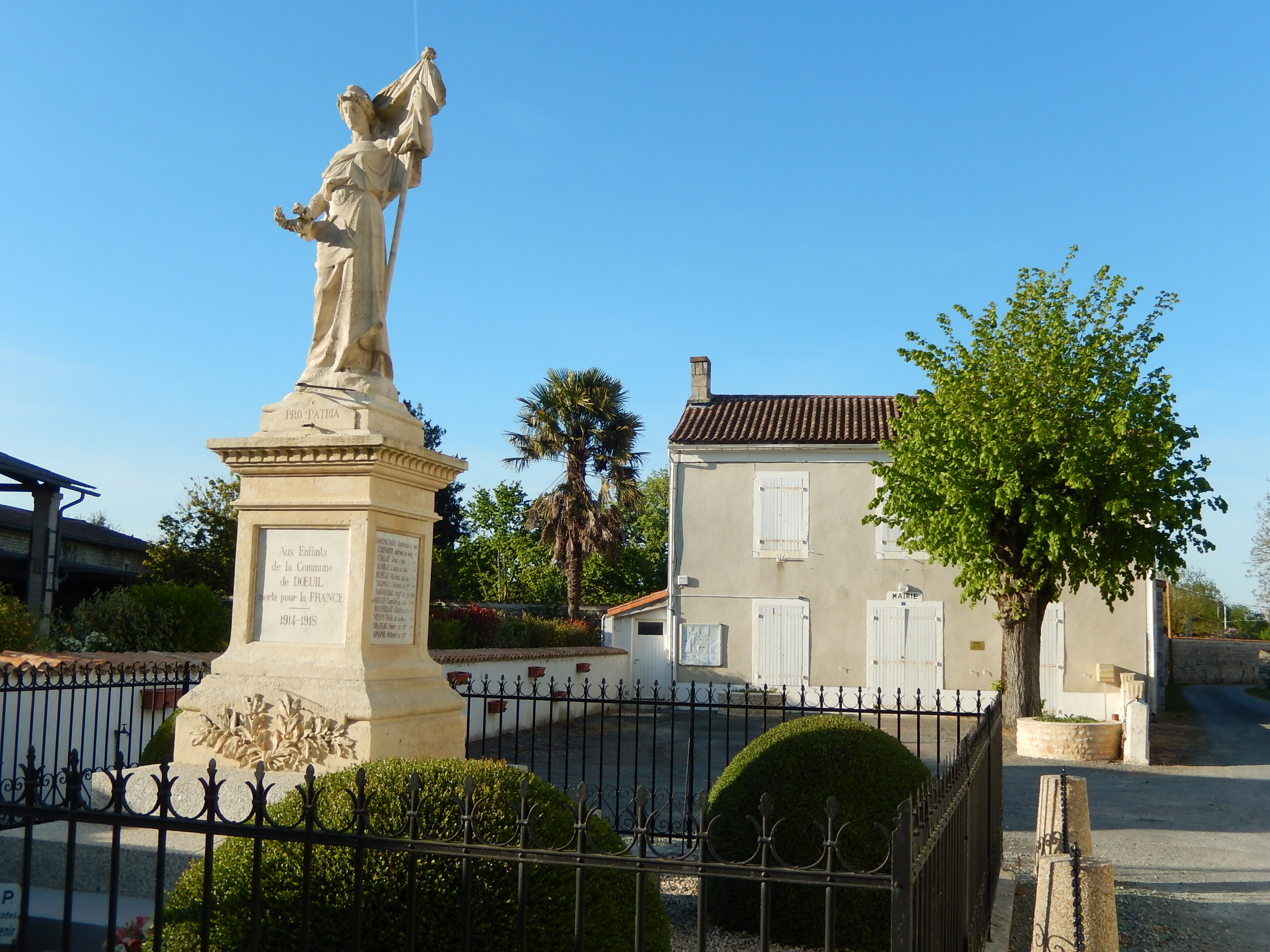
- The war memorial and town hall in Dœuil-sur-le-Mignon

- Coat of arms
- Location of Doeuil-sur-le-Mignon
- Location within France Location within Nouvelle-Aquitaine
- Coordinates: 46°07′54″N 0°32′36″W
- Country: France
- Region: Nouvelle-Aquitaine
- Department: Charente-Maritime
- Arrondissement: Saint-Jean-d'Angély
- Canton: Saint-Jean-d'Angély

Government
  - Mayor (2022–2026): Jacques Trouvat
- Area^{1}: 19.33 km^{2} (7.46 sq mi)
- Highest elevation: 84 m (276 ft)
- Lowest elevation: 28 m (92 ft)
- Population (2023): 373
  - Density: 19.3/km^{2} (50.0/sq mi)
- Time zone: UTC+01:00 (CET)
  - Summer (DST): UTC+02:00 (CEST)
- INSEE/Postal code: 17139 /17330
- ^{1} French Land Register data, which excludes lakes, ponds, glaciers > 1 km^{2} (0.386 sq mi or 247 acres) and river estuaries.

Dœuil-sur-le-Mignon (French pronunciation: [dœj syʁ lə miɲɔ̃]) is a commune in the Charente-Maritime department in southwestern France.

== Population ==
Historical population
Year	Pop.	±% p.a.
1968	436	—
1975	361	−2.66%
1982	325	−1.49%
1990	327	+0.08%
1999	320	−0.24%
2007	331	+0.42%
2012	341	+0.60%
2017	338	−0.18%
2023	373	+1.66%
Source: INSEE

== See also ==
- Communes of the Charente-Maritime department
