= Tonnay-Boutonne =

- Commune
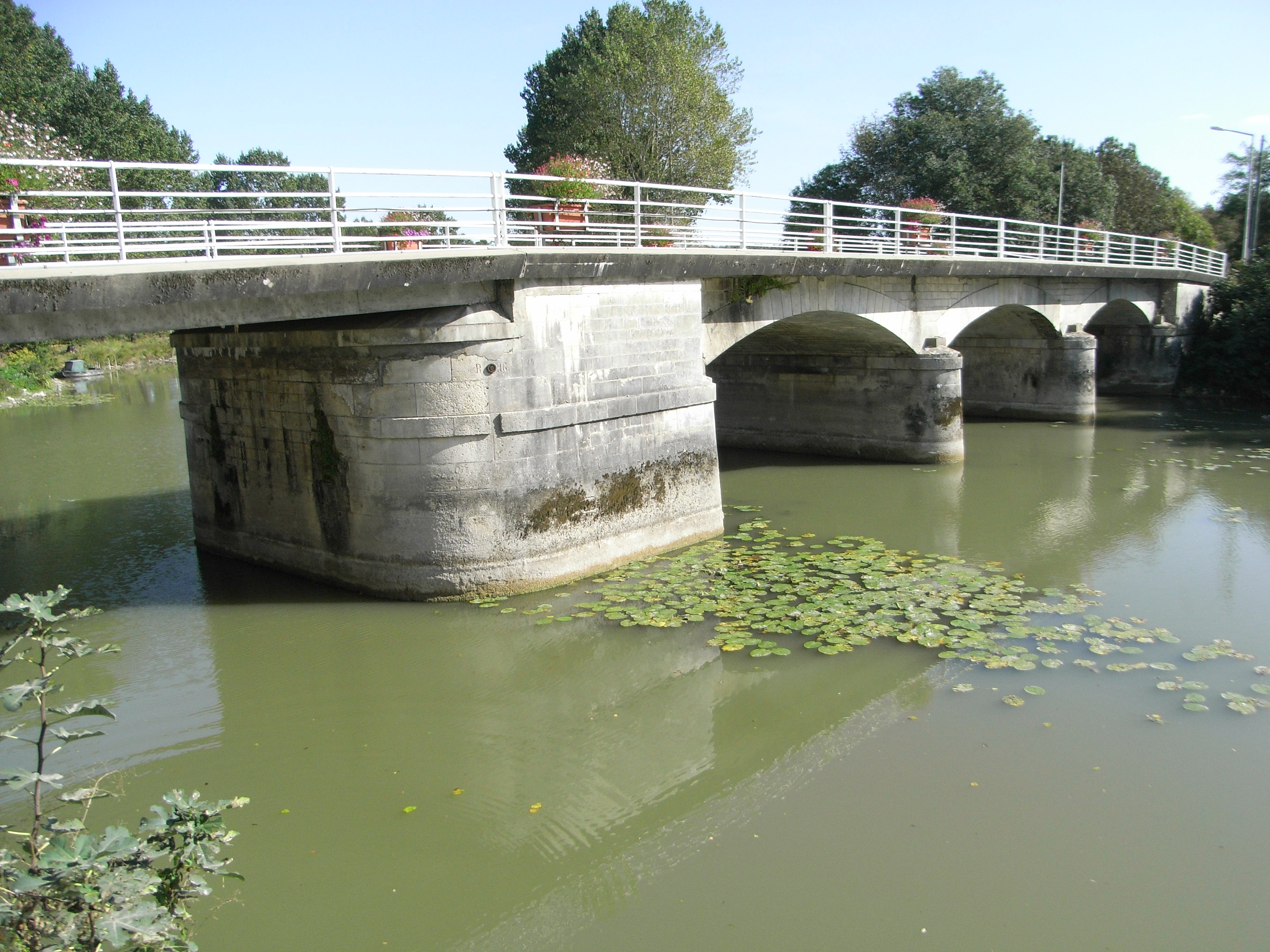
- Bridge over the Boutonne
- Location of Tonnay-Boutonne
- Location within France Location within Nouvelle-Aquitaine
- Coordinates: 45°58′07″N 0°42′20″W
- Country: France
- Region: Nouvelle-Aquitaine
- Department: Charente-Maritime
- Arrondissement: Saint-Jean-d'Angély
- Canton: Saint-Jean-d'Angély

Government
  - Mayor (2020–2026): Julien Gourraud
- Area^{1}: 22.73 km^{2} (8.78 sq mi)
- Elevation: 14 m (46 ft)
- Highest elevation: 46 m (151 ft)
- Lowest elevation: 2 m (6.6 ft)
- Population (2023): 1,188
  - Density: 52.27/km^{2} (135.4/sq mi)
- Time zone: UTC+01:00 (CET)
  - Summer (DST): UTC+02:00 (CEST)
- INSEE/Postal code: 17448 /17380
- ^{1} French Land Register data, which excludes lakes, ponds, glaciers > 1 km^{2} (0.386 sq mi or 247 acres) and river estuaries.

Tonnay-Boutonne (French pronunciation: [tɔnɛ butɔn]) is a commune in the Charente-Maritime department in the Nouvelle-Aquitaine region in southwestern France.

== Geography ==
The village lies on the right bank of the Boutonne, which flows southwest through the southern part of the commune.

== Population ==
Historical population
Year	Pop.	±% p.a.
1968	1,036	—
1975	1,072	+0.49%
1982	1,053	−0.26%
1990	1,088	+0.41%
1999	1,126	+0.38%
2007	1,159	+0.36%
2012	1,160	+0.02%
2017	1,151	−0.16%
2023	1,188	+0.53%
Source: INSEE

== Sights ==
- The door of Saint-Pierre

== See also ==
- Communes of the Charente-Maritime department
