= Le Mung =

- Commune
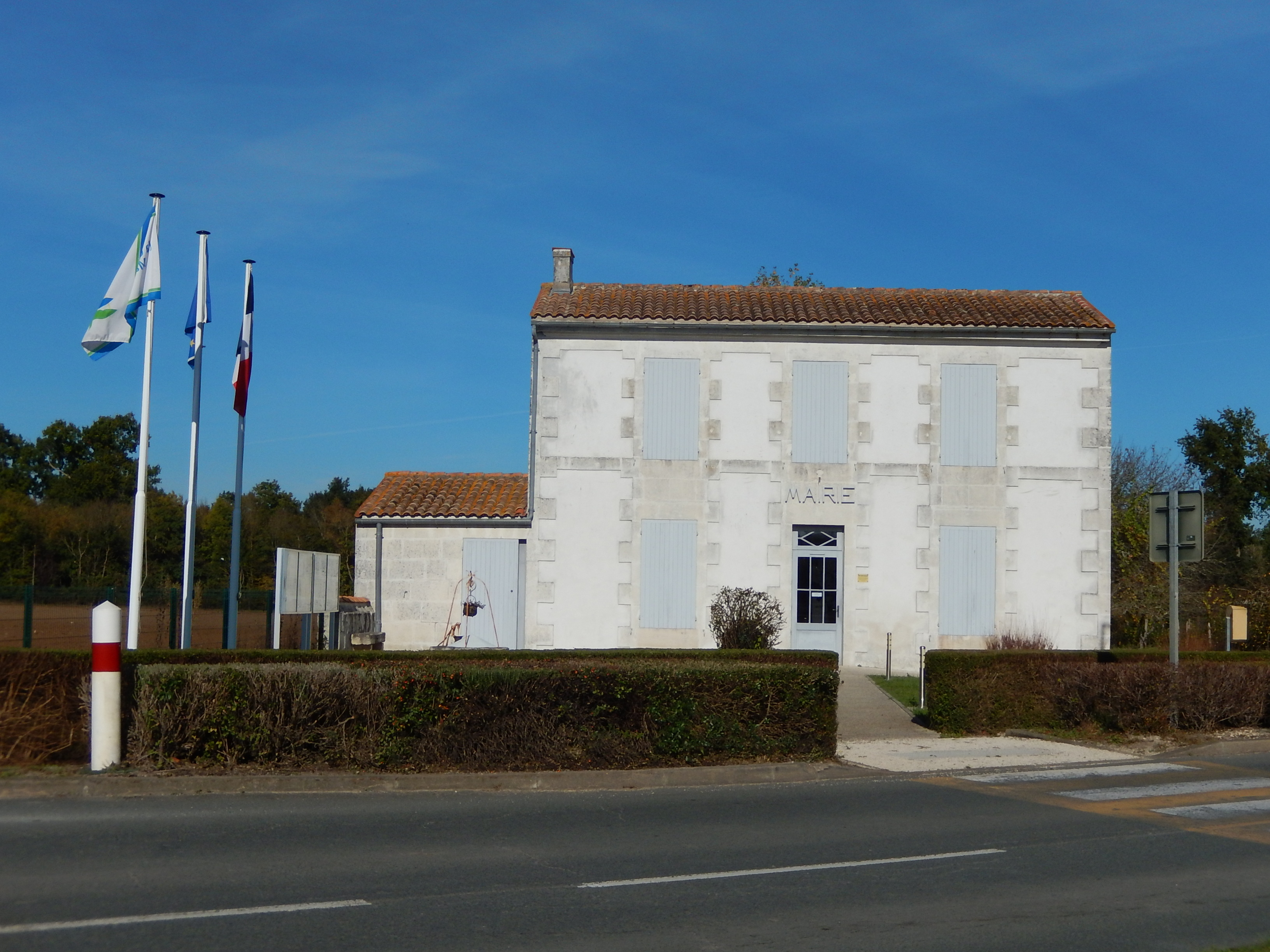
- The town hall in Le Mung
- Location of Le Mung
- Location within France Location within Nouvelle-Aquitaine
- Coordinates: 45°52′32″N 0°42′43″W
- Country: France
- Region: Nouvelle-Aquitaine
- Department: Charente-Maritime
- Arrondissement: Saint-Jean-d'Angély
- Canton: Saint-Jean-d'Angély

Government
  - Mayor (2020–2026): Frédéric Bruneteau
- Area^{1}: 7.52 km^{2} (2.90 sq mi)
- Elevation: 5 m (16 ft)
- Highest elevation: 12 m (39 ft)
- Lowest elevation: 1 m (3.3 ft)
- Population (2023): 317
  - Density: 42.2/km^{2} (109/sq mi)
- Time zone: UTC+01:00 (CET)
  - Summer (DST): UTC+02:00 (CEST)
- INSEE/Postal code: 17252 /17350
- ^{1} French Land Register data, which excludes lakes, ponds, glaciers > 1 km^{2} (0.386 sq mi or 247 acres) and river estuaries.

Le Mung (French pronunciation: [lə mœ̃]) is a commune in the Charente-Maritime department in southwestern France.

== Population ==
Historical population
Year	Pop.	±% p.a.
1968	223	—
1975	198	−1.68%
1982	253	+3.56%
1990	275	+1.05%
1999	264	−0.45%
2007	263	−0.05%
2012	295	+2.32%
2017	305	+0.67%
2023	317	+0.65%
Source: INSEE

== See also ==
- Communes of the Charente-Maritime department
