= Grandjean, Charente-Maritime =

Grandjean
- Commune
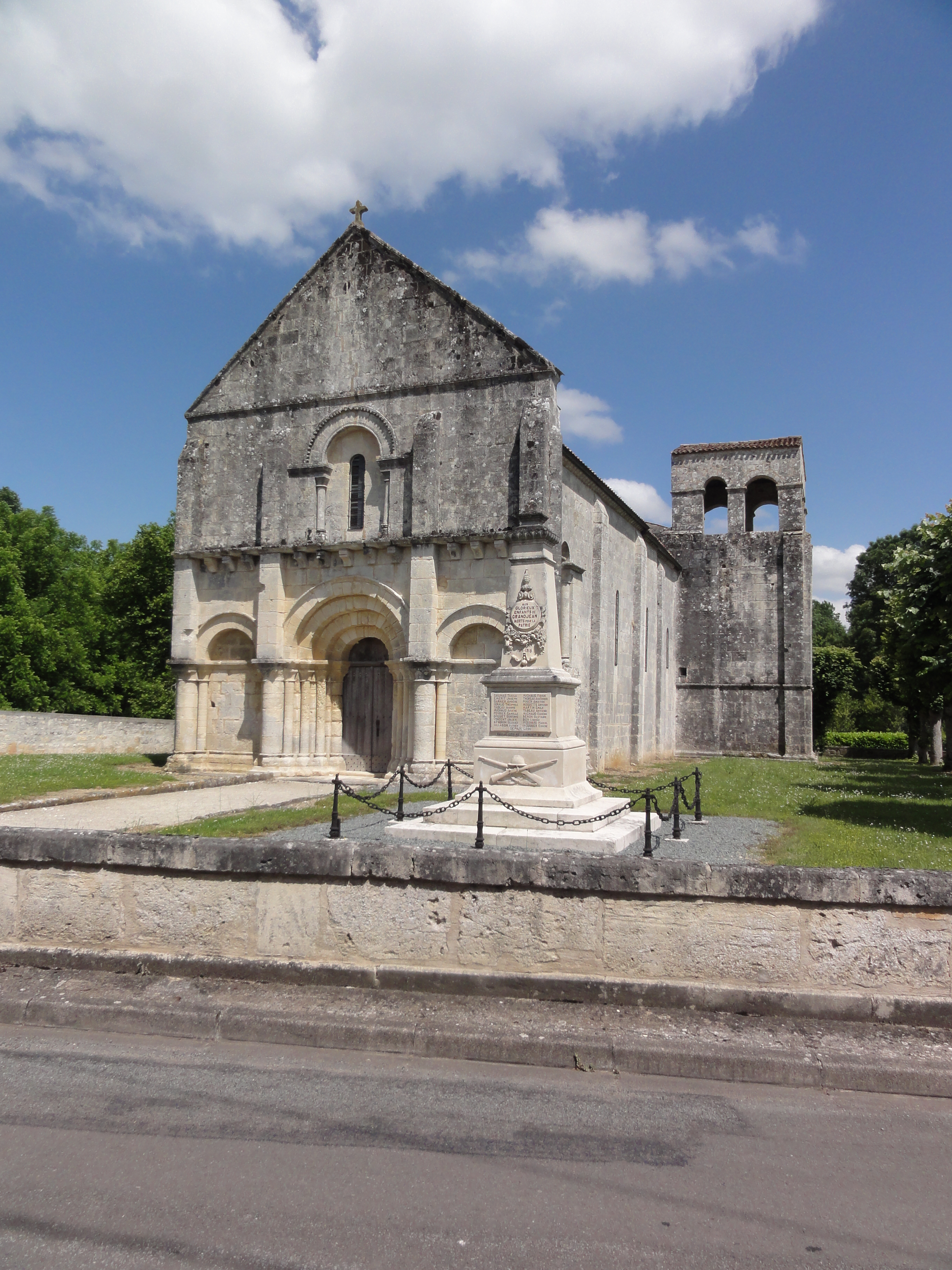
- The church in Grandjean
- Location of Grandjean
- Location within France Location within Nouvelle-Aquitaine
- Coordinates: 45°52′42″N 0°36′23″W
- Country: France
- Region: Nouvelle-Aquitaine
- Department: Charente-Maritime
- Arrondissement: Saint-Jean-d'Angély
- Canton: Saint-Jean-d'Angély

Government
  - Mayor (2020–2026): Alain Foucher
- Area^{1}: 6.1 km^{2} (2.4 sq mi)
- Elevation: 10 m (33 ft)
- Highest elevation: 91 m (299 ft)
- Lowest elevation: 7 m (23 ft)
- Population (2023): 308
  - Density: 50/km^{2} (130/sq mi)
- Time zone: UTC+01:00 (CET)
  - Summer (DST): UTC+02:00 (CEST)
- INSEE/Postal code: 17181 /17350
- ^{1} French Land Register data, which excludes lakes, ponds, glaciers > 1 km^{2} (0.386 sq mi or 247 acres) and river estuaries.

Grandjean (French pronunciation: [ɡʁɑ̃ʒɑ̃]) is a commune in the Charente-Maritime department in the Nouvelle-Aquitaine region in southwestern France.

== Population ==
Historical population
| Year | Pop. | ±% p.a. |
|---|---|---|
| 1968 | 267 | — |
| 1975 | 240 | −1.51% |
| 1982 | 211 | −1.82% |
| 1990 | 224 | +0.75% |
| 1999 | 232 | +0.39% |
| 2007 | 248 | +0.84% |
| 2012 | 269 | +1.64% |
| 2017 | 300 | +2.21% |
| 2023 | 308 | +0.44% |
Source: INSEE

== See also ==
- Communes of the Charente-Maritime department
