= Champdolent =

- Commune
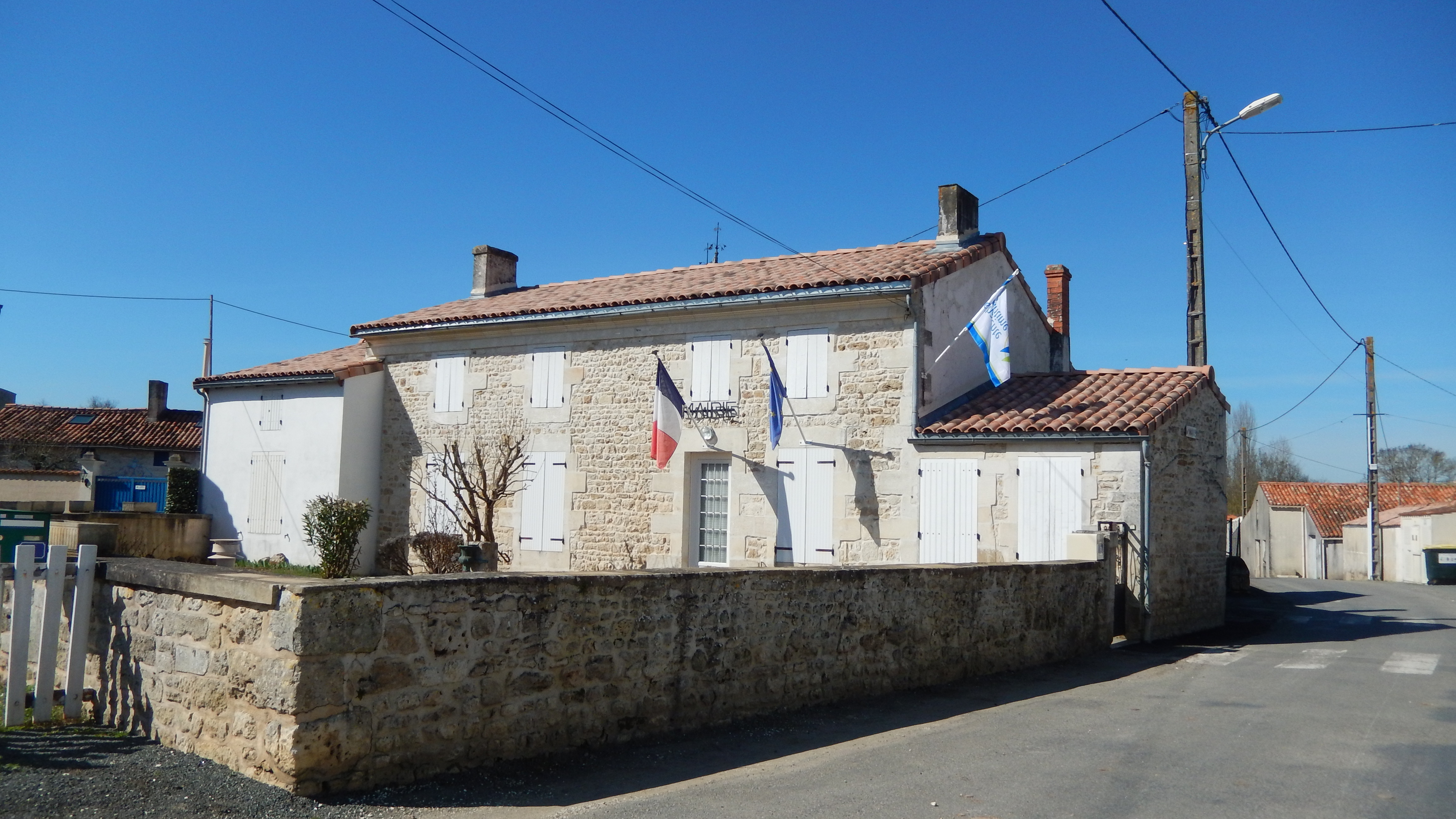
- The town hall in Champdolent
- Location of Champdolent
- Location within France Location within Nouvelle-Aquitaine
- Coordinates: 45°55′12″N 0°48′01″W
- Country: France
- Region: Nouvelle-Aquitaine
- Department: Charente-Maritime
- Arrondissement: Saint-Jean-d'Angély
- Canton: Saint-Jean-d'Angély

Government
  - Mayor (2024–2026): Jean-Jacques Bonnet
- Area^{1}: 12.02 km^{2} (4.64 sq mi)
- Elevation: 6 m (20 ft)
- Highest elevation: 35 m (115 ft)
- Lowest elevation: 1 m (3.3 ft)
- Population (2023): 425
  - Density: 35.4/km^{2} (91.6/sq mi)
- Time zone: UTC+01:00 (CET)
  - Summer (DST): UTC+02:00 (CEST)
- INSEE/Postal code: 17085 /17430
- ^{1} French Land Register data, which excludes lakes, ponds, glaciers > 1 km^{2} (0.386 sq mi or 247 acres) and river estuaries.

Champdolent (French pronunciation: [ʃɑ̃dɔlɑ̃]) is a commune in the Charente-Maritime department in the Nouvelle-Aquitaine region in southwestern France.

== Geography ==
The Boutonne forms the commune's northern and western borders.

== Population ==
Historical population
Year	Pop.	±% p.a.
1968	375	—
1975	332	−1.72%
1982	299	−1.48%
1990	328	+1.16%
1999	372	+1.41%
2007	382	+0.33%
2012	406	+1.23%
2017	400	−0.30%
2023	425	+1.02%
Source: INSEE

== See also ==
- Communes of the Charente-Maritime department
