= Taillant =

- Commune
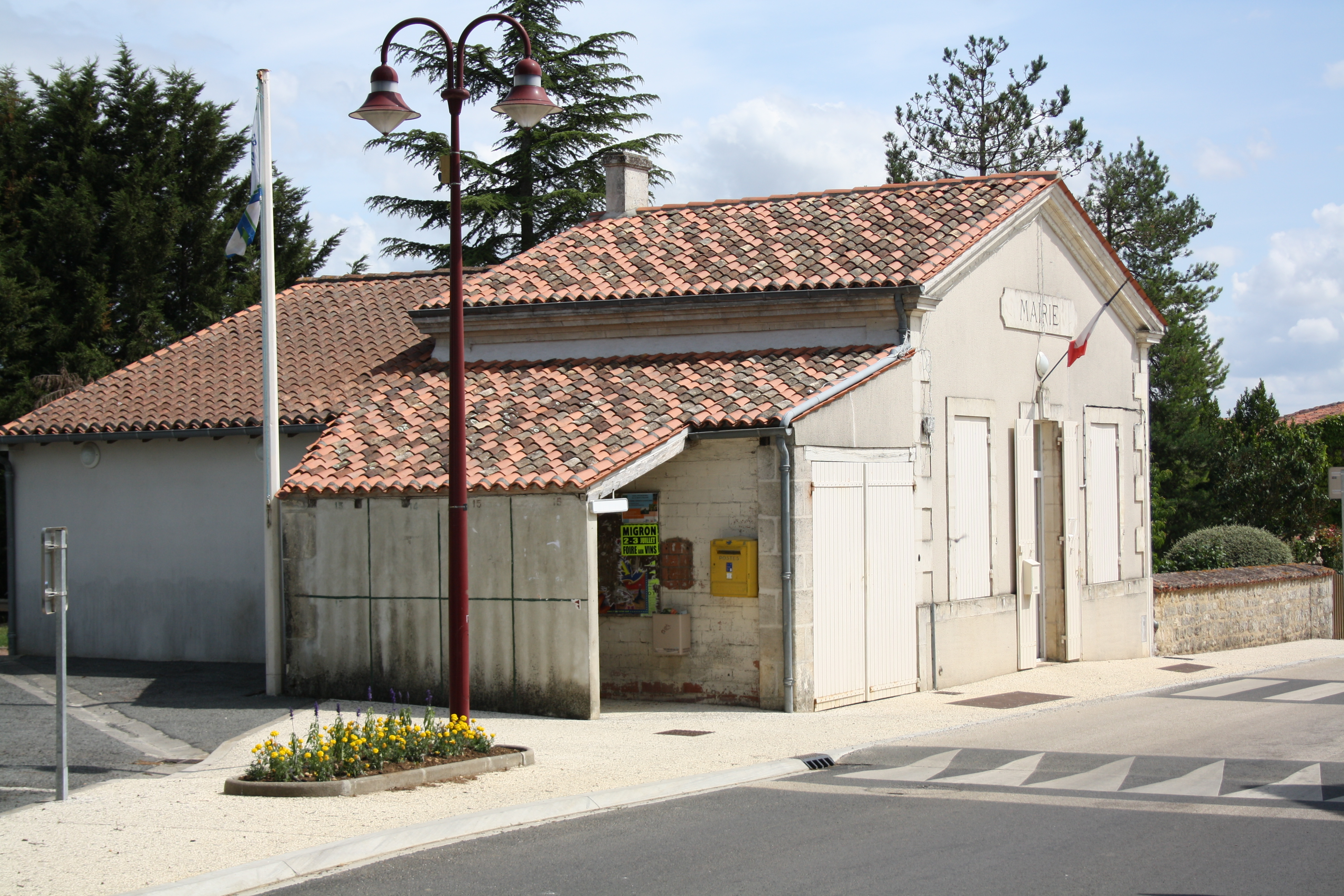
- The town hall in Taillant
- Location of Taillant
- Location within France Location within Nouvelle-Aquitaine
- Coordinates: 45°54′05″N 0°37′10″W
- Country: France
- Region: Nouvelle-Aquitaine
- Department: Charente-Maritime
- Arrondissement: Saint-Jean-d'Angély
- Canton: Saint-Jean-d'Angély

Government
  - Mayor (2020–2026): François Bourgeois
- Area^{1}: 4.96 km^{2} (1.92 sq mi)
- Elevation: 42 m (138 ft)
- Highest elevation: 70 m (230 ft)
- Lowest elevation: 19 m (62 ft)
- Population (2023): 204
  - Density: 41.1/km^{2} (107/sq mi)
- Time zone: UTC+01:00 (CET)
  - Summer (DST): UTC+02:00 (CEST)
- INSEE/Postal code: 17435 /17350
- ^{1} French Land Register data, which excludes lakes, ponds, glaciers > 1 km^{2} (0.386 sq mi or 247 acres) and river estuaries.

Taillant (French pronunciation: [tajɑ̃]) is a commune in the Charente-Maritime department in the Nouvelle-Aquitaine region in southwestern France.

== Population ==
Historical population
Year	Pop.	±% p.a.
1968	131	—
1975	134	+0.32%
1982	132	−0.21%
1990	137	+0.47%
1999	131	−0.50%
2007	154	+2.04%
2012	176	+2.71%
2017	182	+0.67%
2023	204	+1.92%
Source: INSEE

== See also ==
- Communes of the Charente-Maritime department
