= Les Nouillers =

- Commune
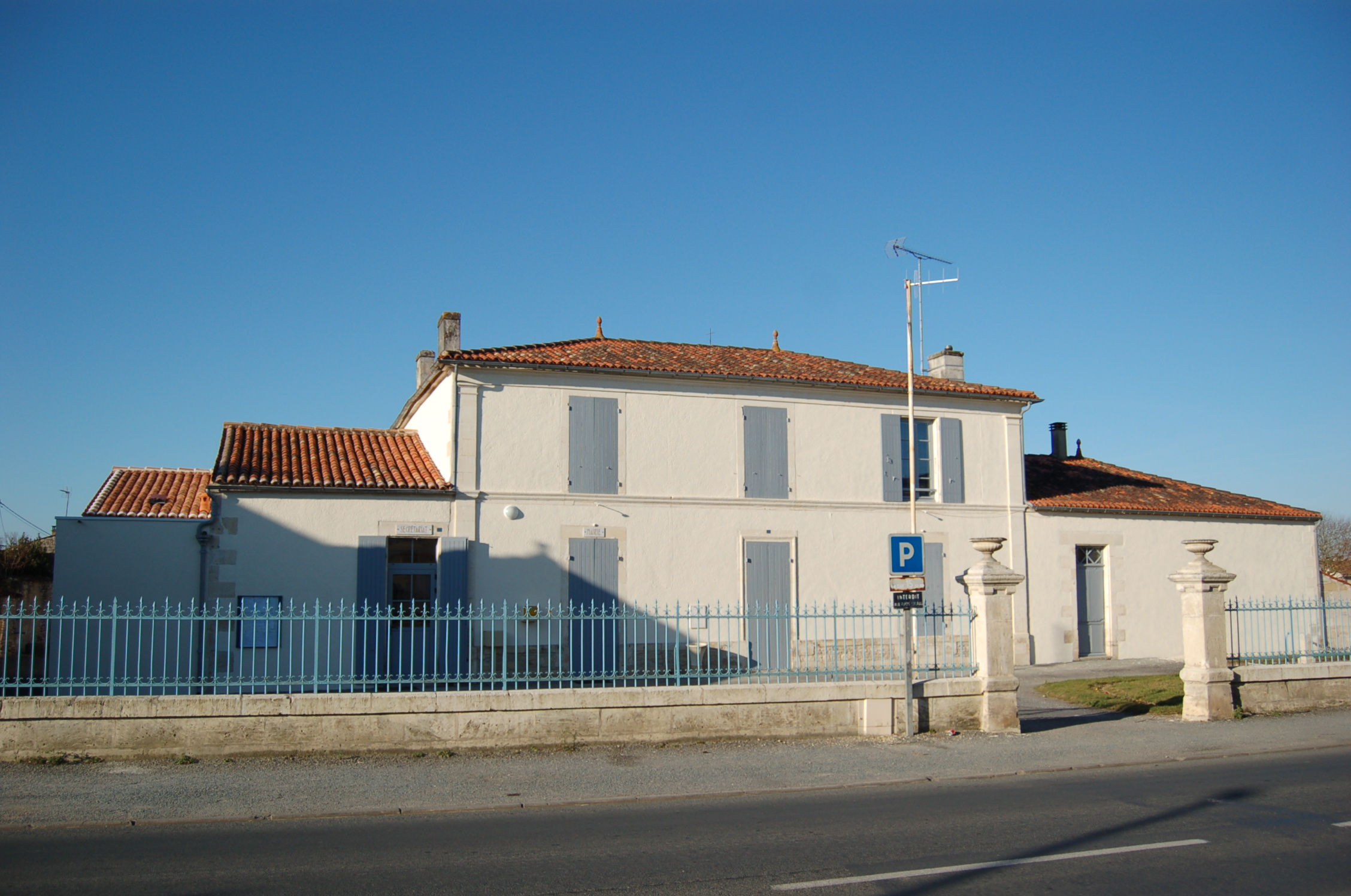
- Town hall
- Location of Les Nouillers
- Location within France Location within Nouvelle-Aquitaine
- Coordinates: 45°55′56″N 0°39′45″W
- Country: France
- Region: Nouvelle-Aquitaine
- Department: Charente-Maritime
- Arrondissement: Saint-Jean-d'Angély
- Canton: Saint-Jean-d'Angély

Government
  - Mayor (2020–2026): Stéphane Ardoin
- Area^{1}: 24.15 km^{2} (9.32 sq mi)
- Elevation: 48 m (157 ft)
- Highest elevation: 64 m (210 ft)
- Lowest elevation: 2 m (6.6 ft)
- Population (2023): 722
  - Density: 29.9/km^{2} (77.4/sq mi)
- Time zone: UTC+01:00 (CET)
  - Summer (DST): UTC+02:00 (CEST)
- INSEE/Postal code: 17266 /17380
- ^{1} French Land Register data, which excludes lakes, ponds, glaciers > 1 km^{2} (0.386 sq mi or 247 acres) and river estuaries.

Les Nouillers (French pronunciation: [le nuje]) is a commune in the Charente-Maritime department in the Nouvelle-Aquitaine region in southwestern France.

== Geography ==
The river Boutonne forms all of the commune's northern border.

== Population ==
Historical population
Year	Pop.	±% p.a.
1968	593	—
1975	534	−1.49%
1982	618	+2.11%
1990	607	−0.22%
1999	611	+0.07%
2007	625	+0.28%
2012	649	+0.76%
2017	698	+1.47%
2023	722	+0.57%
Source: INSEE

== Sights ==
- The Chateau of Nouillers built in the 16th century

== See also ==
- Communes of the Charente-Maritime department
