= Canton of Saint-Jean-d'Angély =

Administrative division in west france

Coordinates: 45.94°N 0.52°W

The canton of Saint-Jean-d'Angély is an administrative division of the Charente-Maritime department, western France. Its borders were modified at the French canton reorganisation which came into effect in March 2015. Its seat is in Saint-Jean-d'Angély.

It consists of the following communes:

1. Annepont
2. Annezay
3. Archingeay
4. Bernay-Saint-Martin
5. Bignay
6. Bords
7. Champdolent
8. Chantemerle-sur-la-Soie
9. Courant
10. La Croix-Comtesse
11. La Devise
12. Dœuil-sur-le-Mignon
13. Essouvert
14. Fenioux
15. Grandjean
16. La Jarrie-Audouin
17. Landes
18. Loulay
19. Lozay
20. Mazeray
21. Migré
22. Le Mung
23. Nachamps
24. Les Nouillers
25. Puy-du-Lac
26. Puyrolland
27. Saint-Crépin
28. Saint-Félix
29. Saint-Jean-d'Angély
30. Saint-Loup
31. Saint-Savinien
32. Taillant
33. Taillebourg
34. Ternant
35. Tonnay-Boutonne
36. Torxé
37. La Vergne
38. Vergné
39. Villeneuve-la-Comtesse
40. Voissay
