= Fenioux, Charente-Maritime =

Fenioux
- Commune
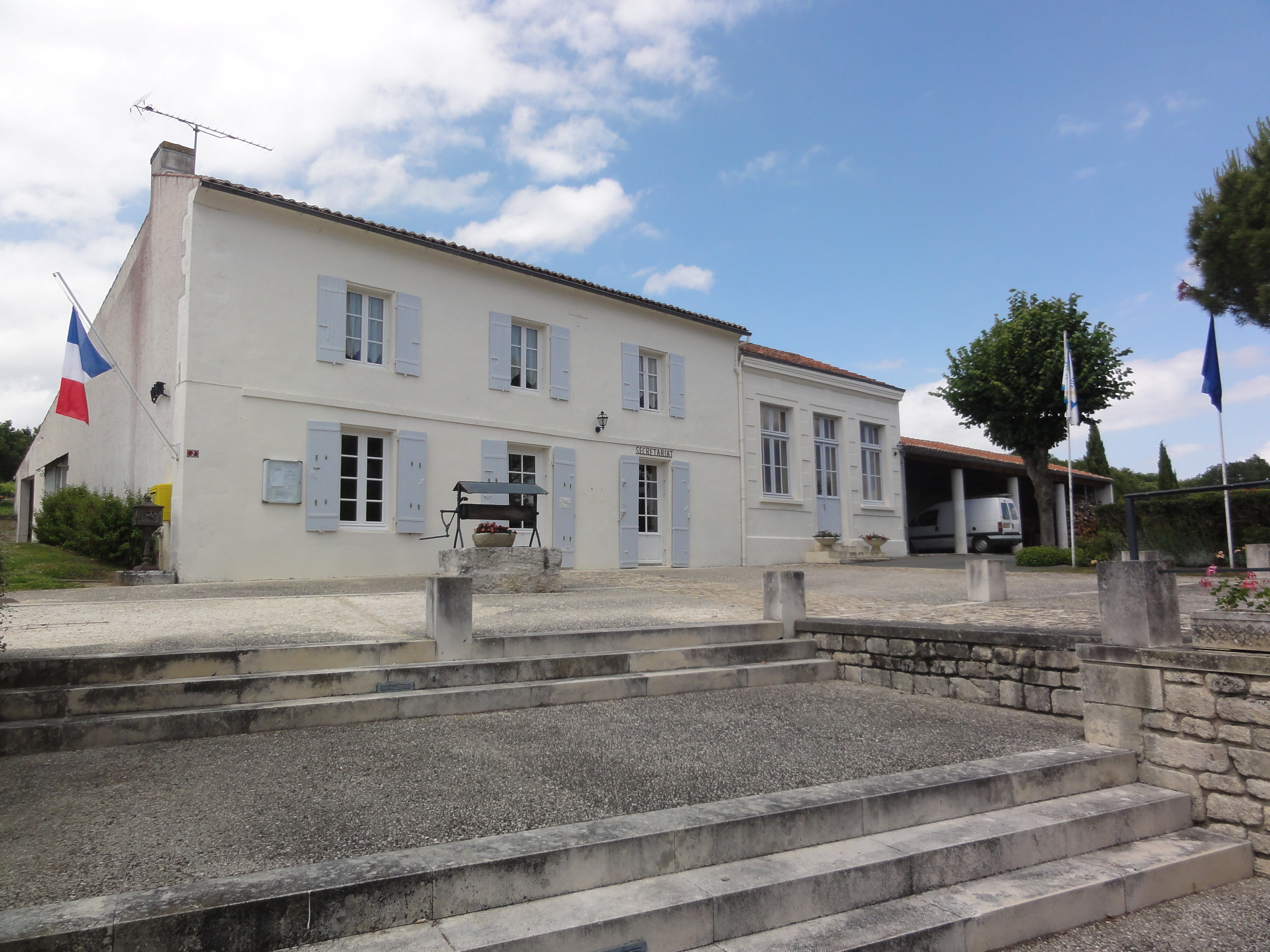
- The town hall in Fenioux
- Location of Fenioux
- Location within France Location within Nouvelle-Aquitaine
- Coordinates: 45°53′27″N 0°35′42″W
- Country: France
- Region: Nouvelle-Aquitaine
- Department: Charente-Maritime
- Arrondissement: Saint-Jean-d'Angély
- Canton: Saint-Jean-d'Angély

Government
  - Mayor (2020–2026): Régis Duthille
- Area^{1}: 9.36 km^{2} (3.61 sq mi)
- Elevation: 43 m (141 ft)
- Highest elevation: 102 m (335 ft)
- Lowest elevation: 20 m (66 ft)
- Population (2023): 158
  - Density: 16.9/km^{2} (43.7/sq mi)
- Time zone: UTC+01:00 (CET)
  - Summer (DST): UTC+02:00 (CEST)
- INSEE/Postal code: 17157 /17360
- ^{1} French Land Register data, which excludes lakes, ponds, glaciers > 1 km^{2} (0.386 sq mi or 247 acres) and river estuaries.

Fenioux (French pronunciation: [fənju]) is a commune in the Canton of Saint-Jean-d'Angély of the Charente-Maritime department in the Nouvelle-Aquitaine region in southwestern France. The romanesque church of Notre-Dame was built in the 11th century. The lanterne des morts was built in the 12th century.

== Population ==
Historical population
Year	Pop.	±% p.a.
1968	122	—
1975	116	−0.72%
1982	134	+2.08%
1990	133	−0.09%
1999	124	−0.78%
2007	126	+0.20%
2012	150	+3.55%
2017	160	+1.30%
2023	158	−0.21%
Source: INSEE

== See also ==
- Communes of the Charente-Maritime department
