= Jean Charles de Saint-Nectaire =

French aristocrat, diplomat and Marshal of France

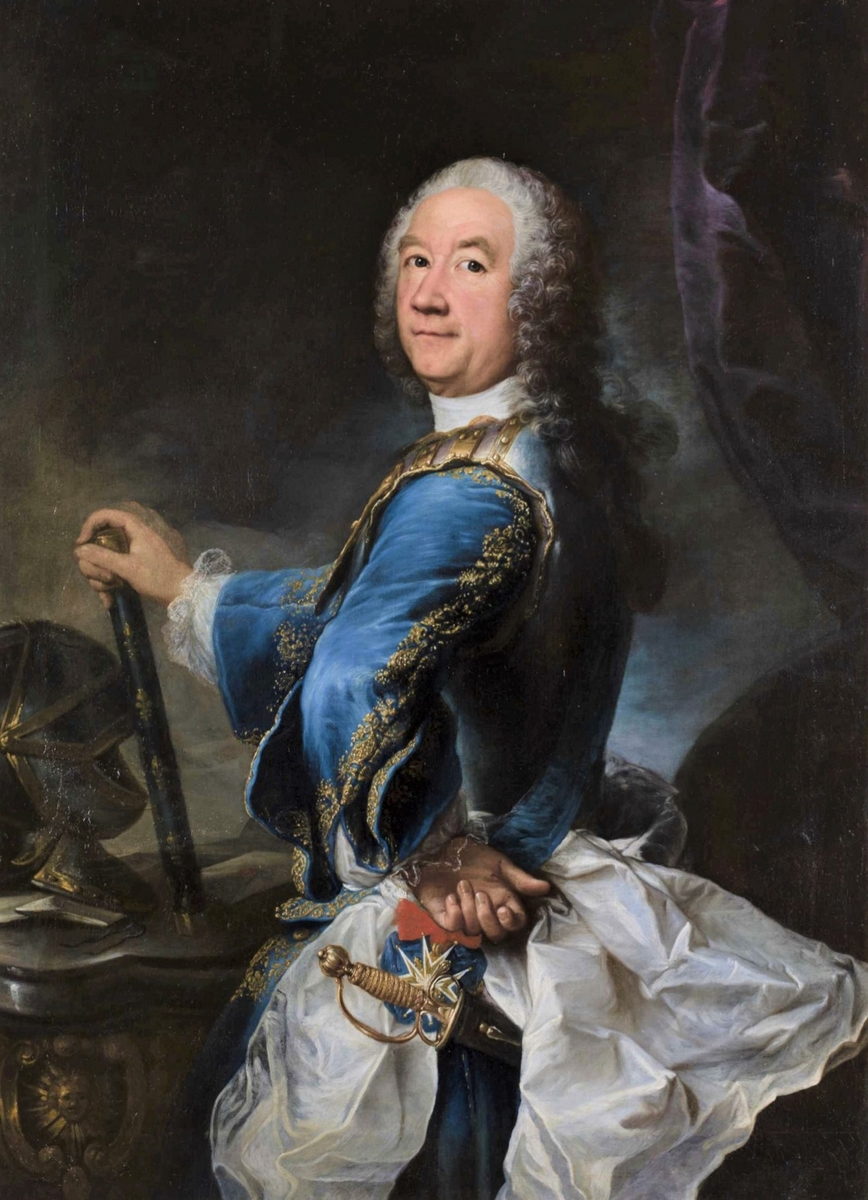
The Marquis de Saint-Nectaire as French Envoy in Turin (1740).

Arms of the Saint-Nectaire family

Jean-Charles, marquis de Saint-Nectaire (11 November 1685 – 23 January 1771, Didonne, Saintonge) was a French aristocrat, diplomat and Marshal of France.

Descended from a noble family who were lords of Brinon, barons of Didonne-sur-Marche, Saint-Germain-sur-Vienne and Brillac as well as holding other lordships in the Auvergne, and Counts of Saint-Victour in the Peerage of France, his father was François de Saint-Nectaire (died 1710), comte de Brinon (cr. 1608) (styled comte de Saint-Nectaire), and his mother was Marie daughter of Charles de Béchillon, baron d'Irlaud.

== Life ==
He joined the French Army as a lieutenant, was promoted to captain and then colonel (1705) of the Senneterre Dragoons, before serving in Italy in 1703 and 1704, and then in Flanders and on the Rhine from 1705 to 1710. He was taken prisoner the following year with the garrison of Bouchain and would remain in captivity for two year Appointed brigadier in 1719 and colonel of the Marche Infantry in 1731, he fought in the Italian campaigns of 1734 and 1735 under Marshal François de Franquetot de Coigny, being promoted Maréchal de camp in 1734.

In 1735, King Louis XV sent him as special envoy to the King of Sardinia, which he remained until 1743.

As lieutenant-general, in 1744 he commanded a division of the French Army during the attack on Villefranche during the War of the Austrian Succession. In 1745 he led military operations in the siege of Casal and the following year took part in Marshal de Maillebois's retreat when faced by superior Austrian and Sardinian forces. De Saint-Nectaire was summoned to join the French Forces in Flanders in 1747 and 1748, and on 24 February 1757 he was promoted Marshal of France.

He refurbished the Château de Didonne as a country residence, circa 1730. The castle was partially destroyed during the French Revolution, housed the Musée du Matériel agricole for 25 years until 2019, and is now a hotel. He also considerably extended the family estates by buying the marquisate of Pisany in 1738, the baronies of Arvert and Saujon in 1758, the castellany of Le Chay in 1764, the lordship of Chênaumoine and a moiety of the lordship of La Touche.

His son, Henri-Charles (1714–1785), was accorded the courtesy title of comte before succeeding, in 1756, as marquis de Saint-Nectaire. He made many improvements to the family's estates, which later devolved upon the marshal's granddaughter, Marie-Charlotte, marquise d'Armentières.

== Marriage and issue ==
On 7 October 1711 he married Marie-Marthe, daughter of Henri, marquis de Saint-Pierre et de Saint-Julien, by his wife Marie-Madeleine Boisseret d'Herblay. Their only child, Henri-Charles, a Colonel in the Infantry, who succeeded as marquis de Saint-Nectaire, married in 1738 Marie-Louise, daughter of Philippe-Emmanuel de Crussol d'Uzès, marquis de Saint-Sulpice, by whom he had two children:

- Marie-Charlotte (14 November 1750 – 26 July 1794, Paris), dame du fief de Songeons (1777–1778), married in 1770 Louis de Brienne de Conflan, marquis d'Armentières;
- Charles-Emmanuel (1752 - 1783), Lieutenant-Colonel of the Régiment de Hainault, no issue.

== See also ==
- Saint-Nectare family

== Bibliography ==
- Le Chesnaye-Aubert, Dictionnaire généalogique, héraldique, chronologique et historique, contenant L'origine & létat actuel des premières Maisons de France, des Maisons souveraines & principales de l'Europe..., Chez Duchesne, Libraire, 1757, 500 pp.
