= Tesson =

- Commune
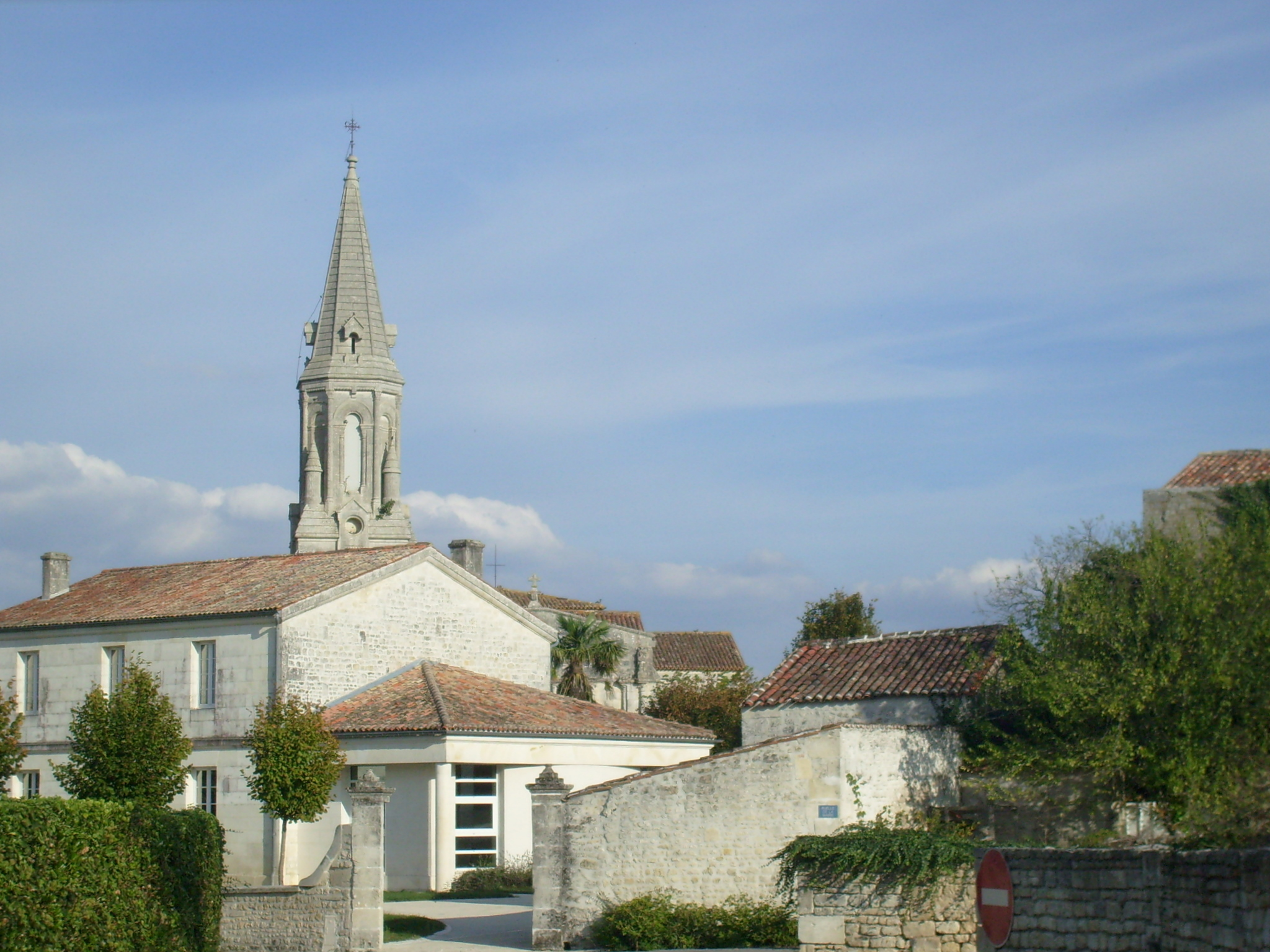
- The church and surroundings in Tesson
- Location of Tesson
- Location within France Location within Nouvelle-Aquitaine
- Coordinates: 45°37′55″N 0°39′11″W
- Country: France
- Region: Nouvelle-Aquitaine
- Department: Charente-Maritime
- Arrondissement: Saintes
- Canton: Thénac
- Intercommunality: Gémozac et Saintonge Viticole

Government
  - Mayor (2020–2026): Laurent Morichon
- Area^{1}: 12.13 km^{2} (4.68 sq mi)
- Highest elevation: 58 m (190 ft)
- Lowest elevation: 34 m (112 ft)
- Population (2023): 1,148
  - Density: 94.64/km^{2} (245.1/sq mi)
- Time zone: UTC+01:00 (CET)
  - Summer (DST): UTC+02:00 (CEST)
- INSEE/Postal code: 17441 /17460
- ^{1} French Land Register data, which excludes lakes, ponds, glaciers > 1 km^{2} (0.386 sq mi or 247 acres) and river estuaries.

Tesson (French pronunciation: [tɛsɔ̃]) is a commune in the Charente-Maritime department in southwestern France.

== Toponymy ==
According to a widespread theory, that name, which is not unique to this particular commune, is a distortion, in the medieval period, from the Late Latin taxo, ionis, itself of Celtic origin, meaning “the badger”. In Old French, it became Taisson. The first settlements were allegedly built in a place where badgers used to dig their burrows.

But the name Tesson could also very well be a reference to a Gallo-Roman villa belonging to a certain Tessius or Thessius, hence in Latin Tessionem (Tessius estate and Tessianus, a, um as an adjective (applied to villa or fundus) and, alternatively, Tessiacum, with the suffix of Gallic origin acum, also meaning "belonging to".

In fact, in some ancient documents, including the lists of parishes of the archpriest of Pons (diocese of Saintes) contained in two “pouillés” (a “pouillé” being an inventory of ecclesiastical benefices) of 1648 and 1683, the village seems to be called Thessac, which clearly originates from Tessiacum.

== History ==
Located on the Bronze road linking Merpins (near Cognac) with the Atlantic coast, the current territory of the municipality of Tesson has been inhabited for a long period. In the hamlet "Le Maine" in particular, prehistoric tools and weapons have been discovered, including a ceremonial anthropoid dagger (the top of the handle is shaped like a human body) dating back to 150 BC. It is being kept at the National Museum of Archaeology in Saint-Germain-en-Laye.

In the Middle Ages, the village happens to be situated on the pilgrimage route to Santiago de Compostela. On both sides of the pediment of the Romanesque church of the village (built in the second half of the twelfth century), two strange sculptures in high relief depicting, one a pilgrim, the other a robber armed with an ax, recall that time.

In the early sixteenth century, the seigneury of Tesson belonged to the Gombaud family. Then they were succeeded by the Bremond, thereafter the Guinot. Tesson got some fame of its own in the eighteenth century when Étienne Guinot, Lord of Tesson and Marquis of Monconseil, Lieutenant General of the King’s armies, decided in 1760 to retire to his estate, after a successful military career. This is the single celebrity of the village. He (re)built there one of the most beautiful castles in the region, later demolished in the nineteenth century. In the village he had a covered market built ( the “Halles”), still visible, so that his cherished Tesson could host fairs and markets, as well as a hospice.

Quarrying also began in Tesson in the eighteenth century. The beautiful (dressed) stone of Tesson, renowned and used for construction, including for saintongeais style houses in the village and elsewhere in the department happened to be a lasting flourishing business. The operation of the quarries ended in 1960. The “route des carrières” street allows to trace the entrances.

Tesson benefited in the nineteenth century from the development of the production of Cognac brandy, especially under the Second Empire. Several beautiful mansions of the village and of some outlying farms date back to this period. In parallel to this, the area devoted to the exploitation of cereals decreased. Also due, of course, to the competition from industrial mills, the many windmills (14 counted in 1820), whose location is still reflected in the names of several hamlets, were abandoned or, for most of them, destroyed. Only two remain.

At the beginning of the Third Republic, Tesson, which had reached a peak population in 1866 (762 inhabitants against 573 in 1806), suffered like other wine-producing towns of Charentes and France from the impact of the crisis of phylloxera (1875). Also affected in its young population through the victims of World War I, Tesson did not exceed again this level until the late 1980s.

The opening in 1894 of the railway line between Saintes and Mortagne-sur-Gironde, which ran through the village - with a stop which was still visible until the 2000s (opposite the present bakery) - was nevertheless a positive development bringing it closer (in time) to the town of Saintes. The line was closed in 1947.

The Government's decree of 13 January 1938 included Tesson in the production area of Cognac brandy called "Fins Bois", one of the six authorized areas based on soil characteristics. It was a comparative advantage for Tesson vis-à-vis some neighboring municipalities (to the west or south) which belong to the slightly least valued area called "Bons Bois."

Since the early 1980s, the municipality’s population is experiencing a resurgence thanks to the maintenance or creation of services and shops (bakery, butcher shop, restaurant, multi-services grocery store ...) and new housing estates or individual buildings that allow it to take advantage of its proximity to the town of Saintes. In 2008, population crossed the threshold of 1000 inhabitants.

== Population ==
Historical population
Year	Pop.	±% p.a.
1968	557	—
1975	546	−0.28%
1982	705	+3.72%
1990	758	+0.91%
1999	812	+0.77%
2007	988	+2.48%
2012	1,010	+0.44%
2017	1,075	+1.26%
2023	1,148	+1.10%
Source: INSEE

== Personalities ==
There was only one notable resident in the commune of Tesson. But Marquis Etienne Louis Antoine Guinot de Monconseil (1695–1782), lord of Tesson, as well as of neighboring Thénac, Courcoury and Rioux, was one of the most famous characters of Saintonge in the eighteenth century.

He was born, depending on sources, either on 16 September 1695 in the parish of St. Peter in Saintes, or more probably in the castle of Tesson on 13 (or 15) September 1695. In 1708, at age 13, he made his debut at the Court of Louis XIV in Versailles, where he was appointed (on 9 May 1708) page to the “Petite Ecurie du Roi” (literally “King’s Little Stable”). It was tactless for him one evening to set fire to the wig of the King with a candlestick, while the latter was leaving the apartment of Madame de Maintenon, the King had married secretly in 1683. Louis XIV forgave him but Etienne Guinot kept lifetime memories of this event.

In 1713, at age 18, he joined the King's Musketeers and was appointed, on 30 November 1717, lieutenant in the regiment of “Gardes Françaises” (French Guards). During the French Régence, Monconseil played and won quite a lot at roulette and biribi, which enabled him to buy in 1722 for 40,000 livres (also partially through debt) the office of colonel of the regiment of Lyonne (the name of his predecessor), which officially took the name of its new colonel in 1723, but also the nickname of "Royal Biribi", as a reference to the way he had paid for it.

He was placed with his men to the service of former King of Poland, Stanislas Leszczynski, later Duke of Lorraine and father in law of Louis XV, who granted him the title of Master of the Royal Hunt. There he met Therese Cecile Pauline de Rioult de Curzay (1707–1787), then a prominent woman and lady in waiting to the former Queen of Poland. He married her in November 1725. She was cousin of Marquise de Prie, who was then the mistress of the Duke of Bourbon, a sort of Prime Minister of Louis XV. He was later appointed in November 1725 (the month of his marriage) Introducer of ambassadors and foreign princes to the King of France, a position he resigned in 1730.

He thereafter pursued a successful military career and participated in many campaigns, interspersed with long stays in Saintonge, in his castle of Tesson. Brigadier of Infantry in 1734, he was appointed in 1748 Lieutenant-General of the King’s and Commander for His Majesty in Upper Alsace in Colmar. In addition to his personal qualities, friendly relationships and sometimes amorous intrigues of his wife were likely no strangers to his brilliant career. She remained all along at the Court and in Île-de-France: she basked in a joyful life and was hosting many well-attended feasts in her pavilion at Bagatelle. She was extremely close to (or maybe sometimes of the closest intimacy with) several ministers and senior characters at the Royal Court. Among her "friendships" featured Count d'Argenson ( Marc Pierre de Voyer d'Argenson of Paulmy, Secretary of State for War from 1743 to 1757) and Marshal of Richelieu ( Louis François Armand du Plessis, Duke of Fronsac, also Prince of Mortagne, Baron of Cozes, Saujon and Barbezieux in terms of areas near Tesson). She succeeded in having her husband titled in 1729 “Marquis” (of Monconseil) by Louis de Lorraine, Prince of Pons, who had consolidated the three seigneuries of Courcoury, Tesson and Monconseil (in Thenac) into a marquisate with the King’s sanction.

However the Marquis of Monconseil, Governor of Colmar, got into trouble with some notables in Alsace and even caused a scandal in 1763 by condemning a maidservant he had accused of having stolen silverware to the "wooden horse" (medieval torture rack). He had to sell his regiment (75,000 livres) and, at the age of 68, to retire in Saintonge and thus give up the perspective of being appointed Marshal, a hope his wife was certainly nourishing for him and herself.

Before settling in his native region and in Tesson permanently, he had expanded his estates by purchasing land and already begun major works, including the construction of his “hôtel particulier” (town-mansion) in Saintes in 1738 (currently the Musée Dupuy-Mestreau, 4 rue Monconseil ), he later enlarged in 1767, and from 1735 onwards, the reconstruction of the castle of Tesson, which, according to the records, reflected the influence of architect Boffrand Germain, who had practiced in Lorraine (castle of Lunéville).

The prestigious new castle of Tesson, considered then as one of the most beautiful of the region, consisted of three one-story pavilions connected by wings set back. The roof of the largest central pavilion was covered with a dome and the centerpiece was a vast lounge which occupied the whole height. The ground floor also contained two large fireplaces and a circular gallery which could be reached by a stone staircase with double revolution surrounded the lounge at the first floor level.

The castle was demolished in the nineteenth century. Only plans, drawings and descriptions remain of what it looked like. At its location, in the axis of the tree-lined road which connected the castle to the village church, stands now a mansion (1920) of two stores.

In the former castle's outbuildings, a saintongeais style house was also built in 1848 (it is a private estate called “Chateau Guynot”). It has a vaulted cellar dating from the eighteenth century. In what remains of the castle’s park in this estate, is a “glacière” (underground cooler room) from the same period. Étienne Guinot had discovered its usefulness at Versailles for refreshed drinks, sorbets and food preservation. But the ice was also used in medicine at the hospice of the village.

In his nearby property of Thénac, the Marquis had only the “Grand Logis” (main building) repaired. It also was demolished in the nineteenth century.

In 1773, the Marquis decided the establishment of fairs and markets in Tesson. They were to take place inside the covered market (“Halles”) he had ordered to be built with his own money. He also bought a house to serve as a parsonage house for the (catholic) vicar. In 1777, besides a donation of 3,000 livres to buy the house and garden on which was built the Surgery School of Saintes (rue Saint-Vivien), Monconseil founded in Tesson a hospice to provide the poor inhabitants of his parishes Tesson, Rioux, Thenac and Courcoury, with "the assistance they need in their diseases." The house whose façade is home to the current village notary office, was entrusted to the nuns of the Congregation of Wisdom, to which he granted an annuity for this purpose. The nuns were also meant to be responsible for education and instruction of children of the parishes.

He died on 14 October 1782 in his castle of Tesson. His wife went into an ostentatious mourning in Paris but never came to Saintonge. It was up to his son in law, Count "de la Tour du Pin", to settle the succession and to his second daughter to have a plaque of white marble engraved in his memory and placed on the wall of the transept of the church. The wording mentions his kindness and good deeds towards the community during his edifying old age. But it never names him, "because his will prohibited it”. Under a black cross, this plaque is still to be seen.

== Sights ==
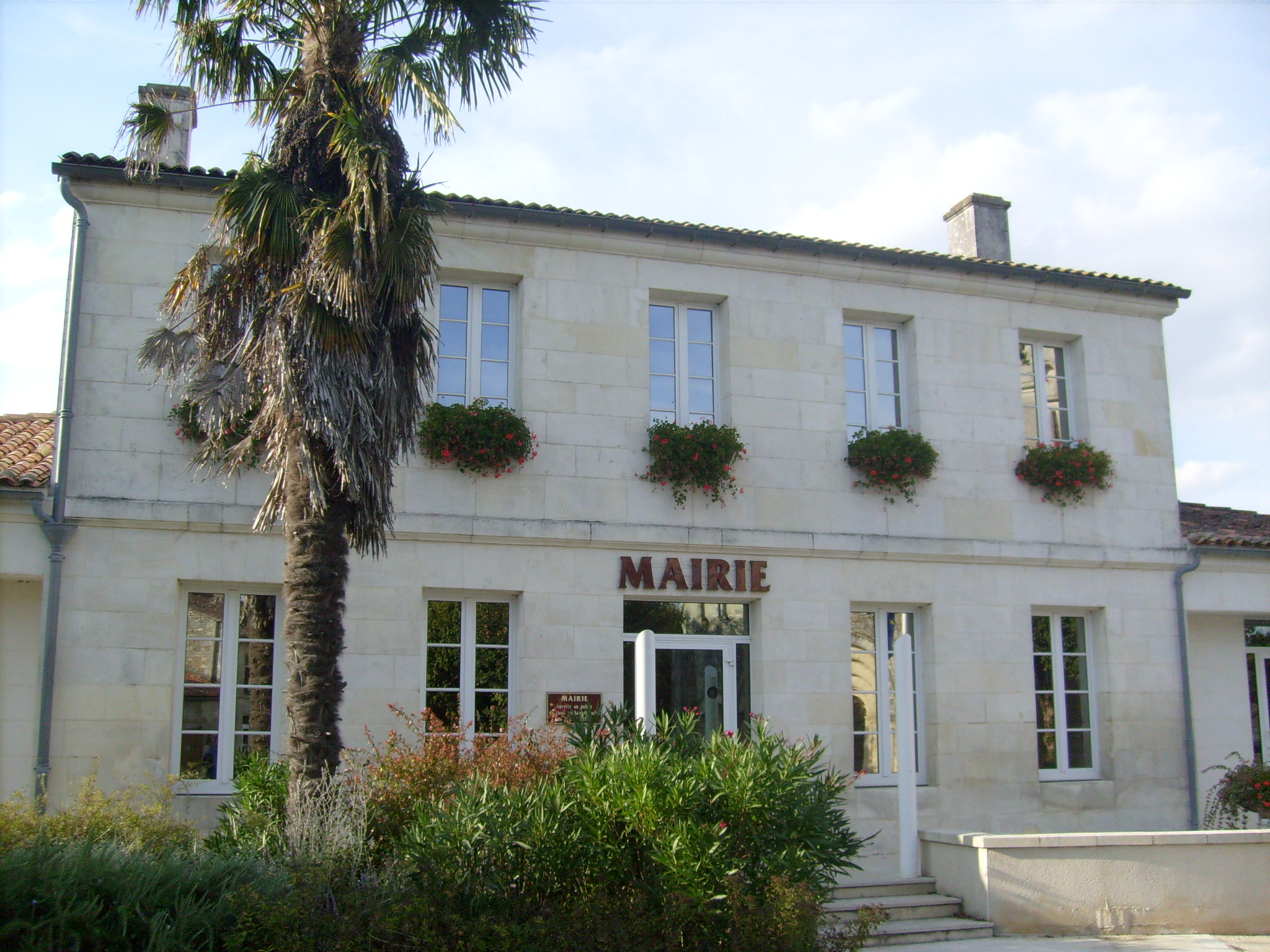
Town hall

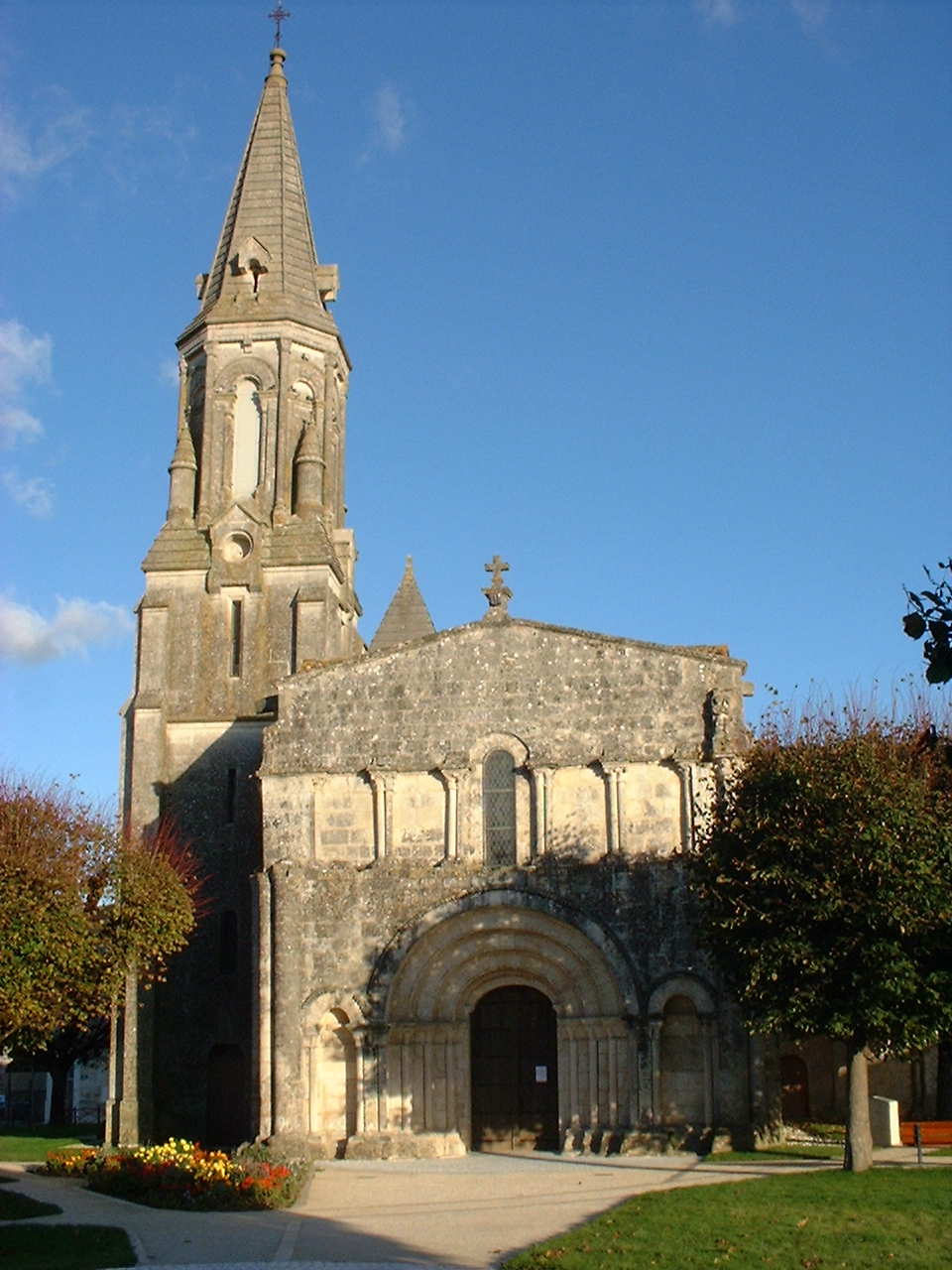
Saint-Grégoire church

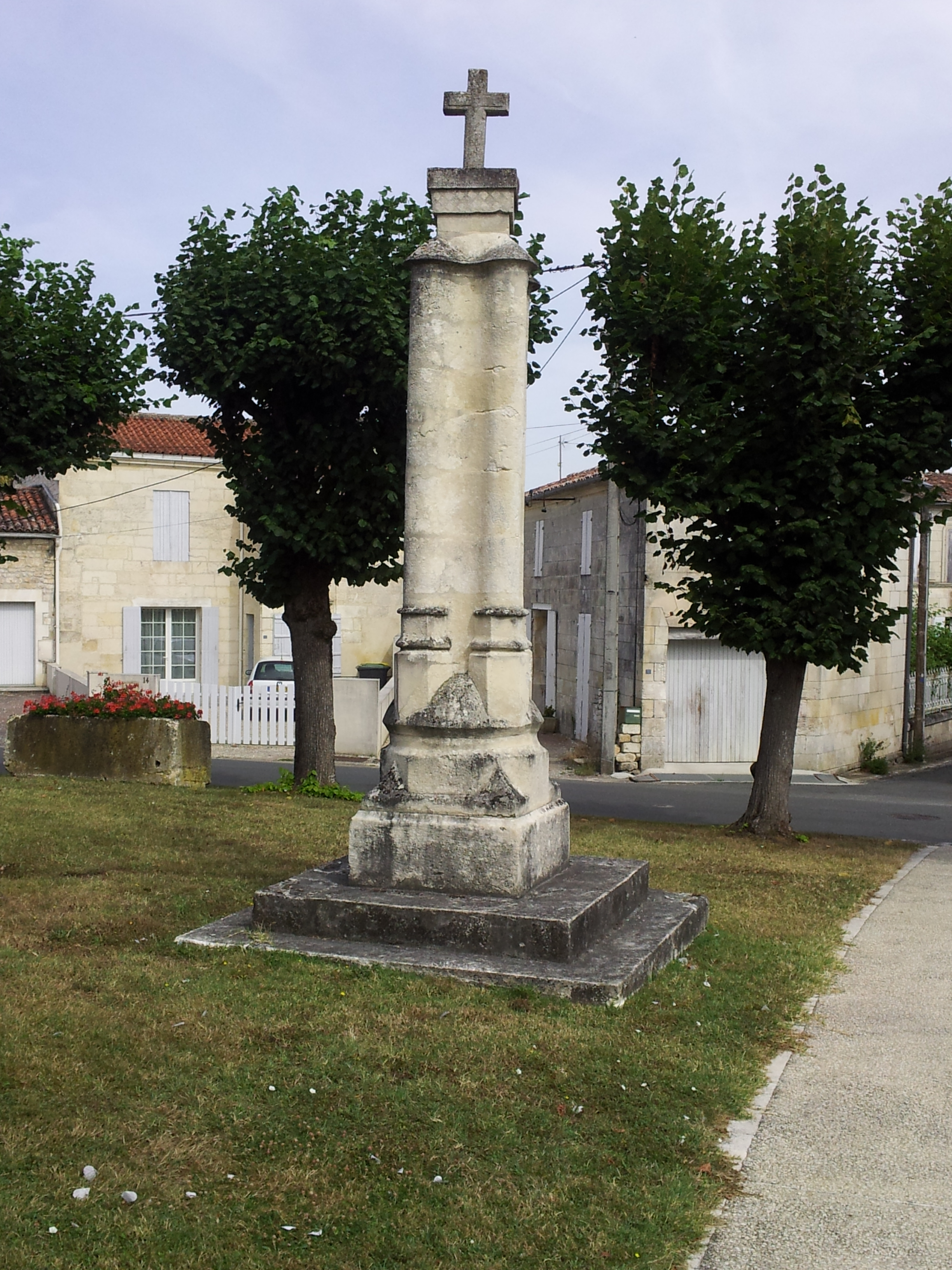
Calvary cross

=== The St. Grégoire (Saint Gregory) church ===
Illustrating the transition between the Romanesque and Gothic styles in Saintonge, it is dedicated to St. Gregory the Great (pope). Registered as a "historic monument" since 1910, the Church of St. Gregory of Tesson was built during the second half of the twelfth century.

The front (west side) has a semicircular portal flanked by two blind arches. The arches are decorated with diamond shaped motifs. At the upper level, an elegant colonnade ends with a triangular pediment. At the two corners of the pediment, two strange high relief sculptures allegedly depict an attack on a pilgrim of Santiago of Compostela: one is a pilgrim (on the left), and the other a robber armed with an ax (on the right).

At the crossing of the transept, clustered columns are set at the different corners in order to support the basis of a ribbed vault (early thirteenth century), at the location where a dome was originally scheduled or may have existed. The south wall of the nave was pierced, under two arches, with two openings, one clover-shaped, the other moon-shaped. The current bell tower is an addition to the original church (1892). The bronze bell, donated by Jean de Bremond, lord of Tesson, dates from 1583. Inside, on the east wall of the transept (on the right), a marble plaque (100 x 50 cm) recalls the benefits extended by Marquis of Monconseil (1695–1782), the celebrity of the village.

=== The stepped cross or calvary cross ("Croix Hosannière") ===
Next to the church, where the entrance to the former cemetery was, stands a Calvary cross of the fifteenth century. Quite simple, this small stone cross rests on a three-level support decorated with geometric patterns, set on a molded quatrefoil column. The column itself stands on a two-tier base.

=== The covered market (Les Halles) ===
In 1773, the Marquis de Monconseil, Lord of Tesson, decided the establishment of fairs and markets. He entrusted the construction of a covered space, a passage, linking the main road to the church square, to a local carpenter, Pierre Fabvre. The "Halles" are very well preserved. They consist of a gallery based on a low wall to the south and on a full wall to the north, surmounted by a wooden framework based on ten pillars. They are covered with curved roof tiles. Until the early 1960s, a fair was held on the fourth Monday of each month. They are still used during the annual flea market (in June), organized by the Foyer Rural (rural club) of Tesson.

=== The former hospice ===
Located at 24 Avenue Saint Grégoire, it was until recently (2019) the local notary office. Its entrance is separated from the main road (Avenue Saint Grégoire) by a small garden adjacent to the covered market. Built in 1777 at the end of the driveway leading to the castle, this building was originally the hospice built by the Marquis de Monconseil for the "poor sick" of his four parishes. He had secured an annuity of 1000 livres to the nuns of the Congregation of Wisdom for them to take care of it. For an estimated total of 17,000 livres in an agreement with the Congregation of Wisdom (approved by letters patent of Louis XVI in November 1776), he financed, in addition to the cost of the construction, furniture, clothes, medical equipment for four beds, in the hospice whose capacity was sixteen. The nuns were also responsible for religious education and instruction of children. The hospice was closed during the French Revolution.

=== The “Souci” of Chadennes ===
“Souci” is an old term which refers to a depression or cavity natural karst that drains and absorbs rainwater. The souci of Chadennes opens north of the commune, after the hamlet of Chadennes, west of the road to Saintes. The sinkhole of the “souci”, almost 10 m in diameter, leads to underground galleries and caves. This curiosity is the source of a legend which portrays a Lord of Tesson in love with the Lady of the Manor of Rioux. The latter drowned in the Charente river on their wedding day and her body could not be found. After having obtained, with a purse of golden coins, the assistance of the witch of Chadennes to find his beloved, he descended into the fault. He was equipped by the witch with two nuts that were supposed, when struck against each other, to produce a bright light. According to the witch, the souci was an entrance to the underworld. After some time, he heard his wife calling him and she followed him backwards. But it was actually a vampire. Using the two magic nuts, he managed to dazzle the monster who took refuge in the depths of the underworld. Thereafter the Lord of Tesson ordered rocks to be thrown into the fault, which allegedly explains why, even if you are a speleologist, you cannot go that deep now.

== See also ==
- Communes of the Charente-Maritime department
