= Thézac =

Thézac may refer to the following places in France:

- Thézac, Charente-Maritime, a commune in the Charente-Maritime department
- Thézac, Lot-et-Garonne, a commune in the Lot-et-Garonne department
