= Varzay =

- Commune
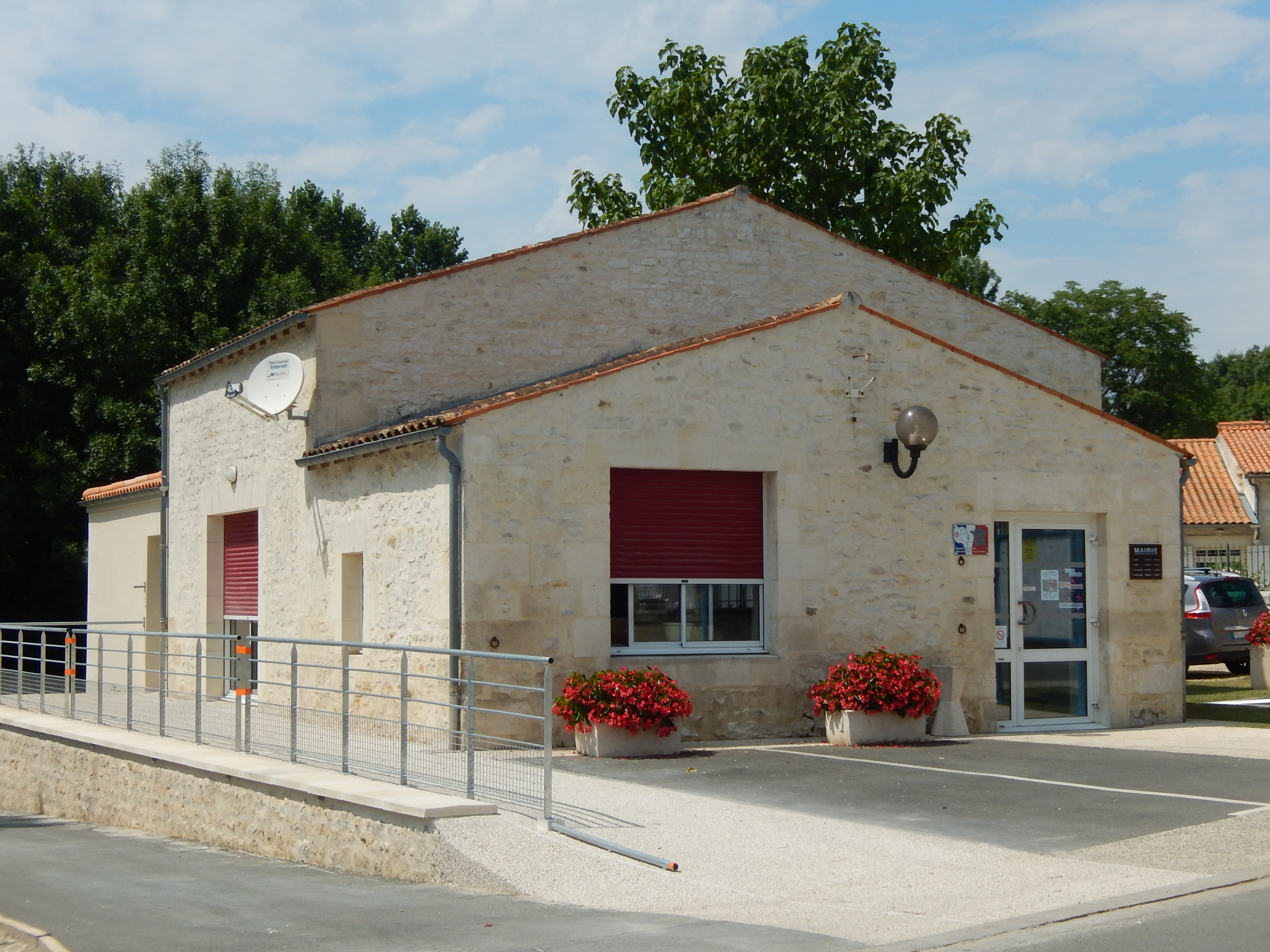
- The town hall in Varzay
- Location of Varzay
- Location within France Location within Nouvelle-Aquitaine
- Coordinates: 45°42′21″N 0°44′01″W
- Country: France
- Region: Nouvelle-Aquitaine
- Department: Charente-Maritime
- Arrondissement: Saintes
- Canton: Thénac
- Intercommunality: CA Saintes

Government
  - Mayor (2020–2026): Bernard Châteaugiron
- Area^{1}: 14.04 km^{2} (5.42 sq mi)
- Highest elevation: 48 m (157 ft)
- Lowest elevation: 23 m (75 ft)
- Population (2023): 845
  - Density: 60.2/km^{2} (156/sq mi)
- Time zone: UTC+01:00 (CET)
  - Summer (DST): UTC+02:00 (CEST)
- INSEE/Postal code: 17460 /17460
- ^{1} French Land Register data, which excludes lakes, ponds, glaciers > 1 km^{2} (0.386 sq mi or 247 acres) and river estuaries.

Varzay (French pronunciation: [vaʁzɛ]) is a commune in the Charente-Maritime department in southwestern France.

== Population ==
Historical population
| Year | Pop. | ±% p.a. |
|---|---|---|
| 1968 | 468 | — |
| 1975 | 474 | +0.18% |
| 1982 | 592 | +3.23% |
| 1990 | 634 | +0.86% |
| 1999 | 671 | +0.63% |
| 2007 | 731 | +1.08% |
| 2012 | 804 | +1.92% |
| 2017 | 816 | +0.30% |
| 2023 | 845 | +0.58% |
Source: INSEE

== See also ==
- Communes of the Charente-Maritime department
