= Luchat =

- Commune
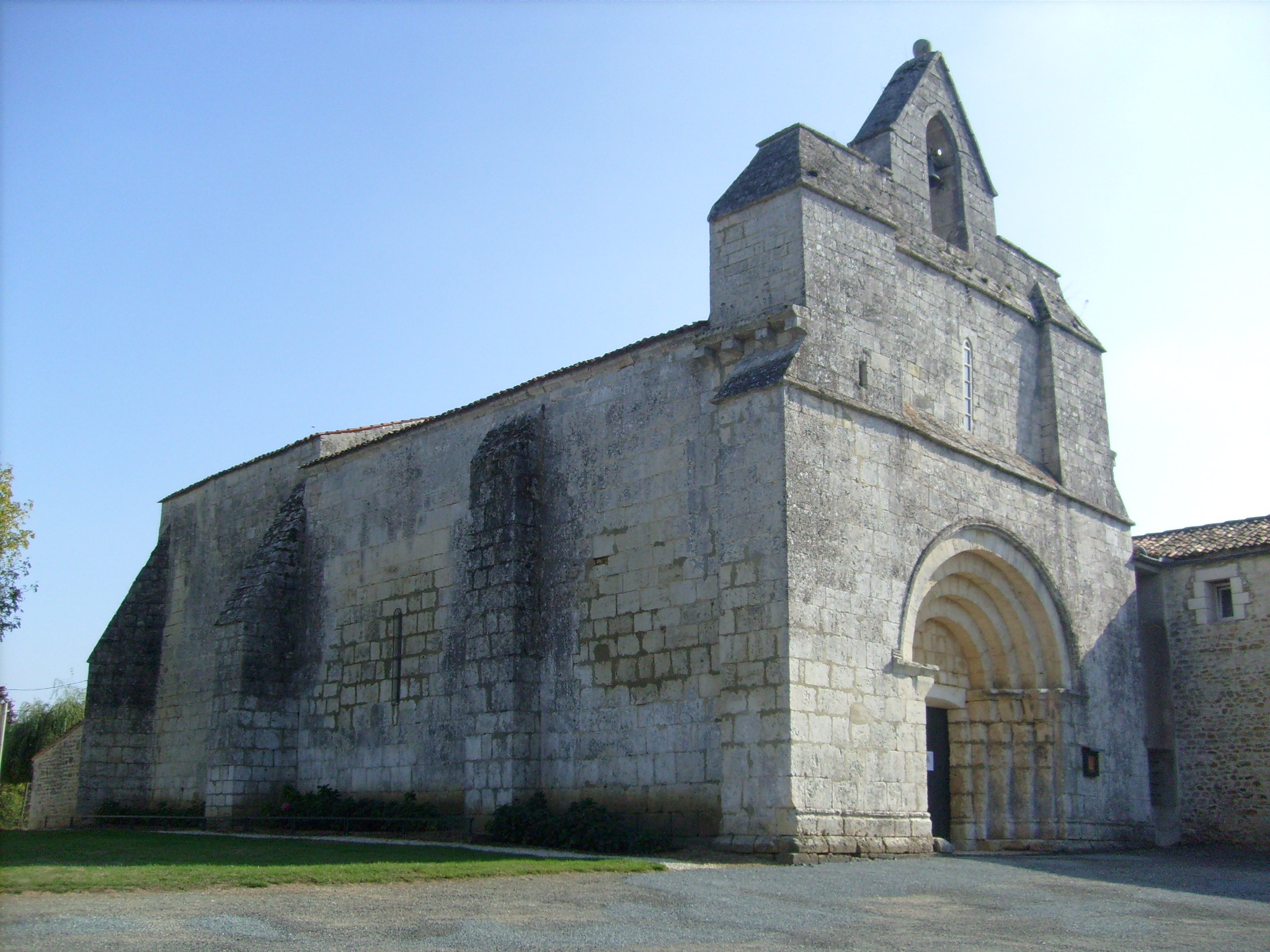
- The church in Luchat
- Location of Luchat
- Location within France Location within Nouvelle-Aquitaine
- Coordinates: 45°43′08″N 0°45′43″W
- Country: France
- Region: Nouvelle-Aquitaine
- Department: Charente-Maritime
- Arrondissement: Saintes
- Canton: Thénac
- Intercommunality: CA Saintes

Government
  - Mayor (2020–2026): Jacki Ragonneaud
- Area^{1}: 4.67 km^{2} (1.80 sq mi)
- Highest elevation: 43 m (141 ft)
- Lowest elevation: 22 m (72 ft)
- Population (2023): 511
  - Density: 109/km^{2} (283/sq mi)
- Time zone: UTC+01:00 (CET)
  - Summer (DST): UTC+02:00 (CEST)
- INSEE/Postal code: 17214 /17600
- ^{1} French Land Register data, which excludes lakes, ponds, glaciers > 1 km^{2} (0.386 sq mi or 247 acres) and river estuaries.

Luchat (French pronunciation: [lyʃa]) is a commune in the Charente-Maritime department in southwestern France.

== Population ==
Historical population
| Year | Pop. | ±% p.a. |
|---|---|---|
| 1968 | 194 | — |
| 1975 | 176 | −1.38% |
| 1982 | 190 | +1.10% |
| 1990 | 214 | +1.50% |
| 1999 | 235 | +1.05% |
| 2007 | 356 | +5.33% |
| 2012 | 479 | +6.12% |
| 2017 | 525 | +1.85% |
| 2023 | 511 | −0.45% |
Source: INSEE

== See also ==
- Communes of the Charente-Maritime department
