= Coulonges, Charente-Maritime =

Coulonges
- Commune
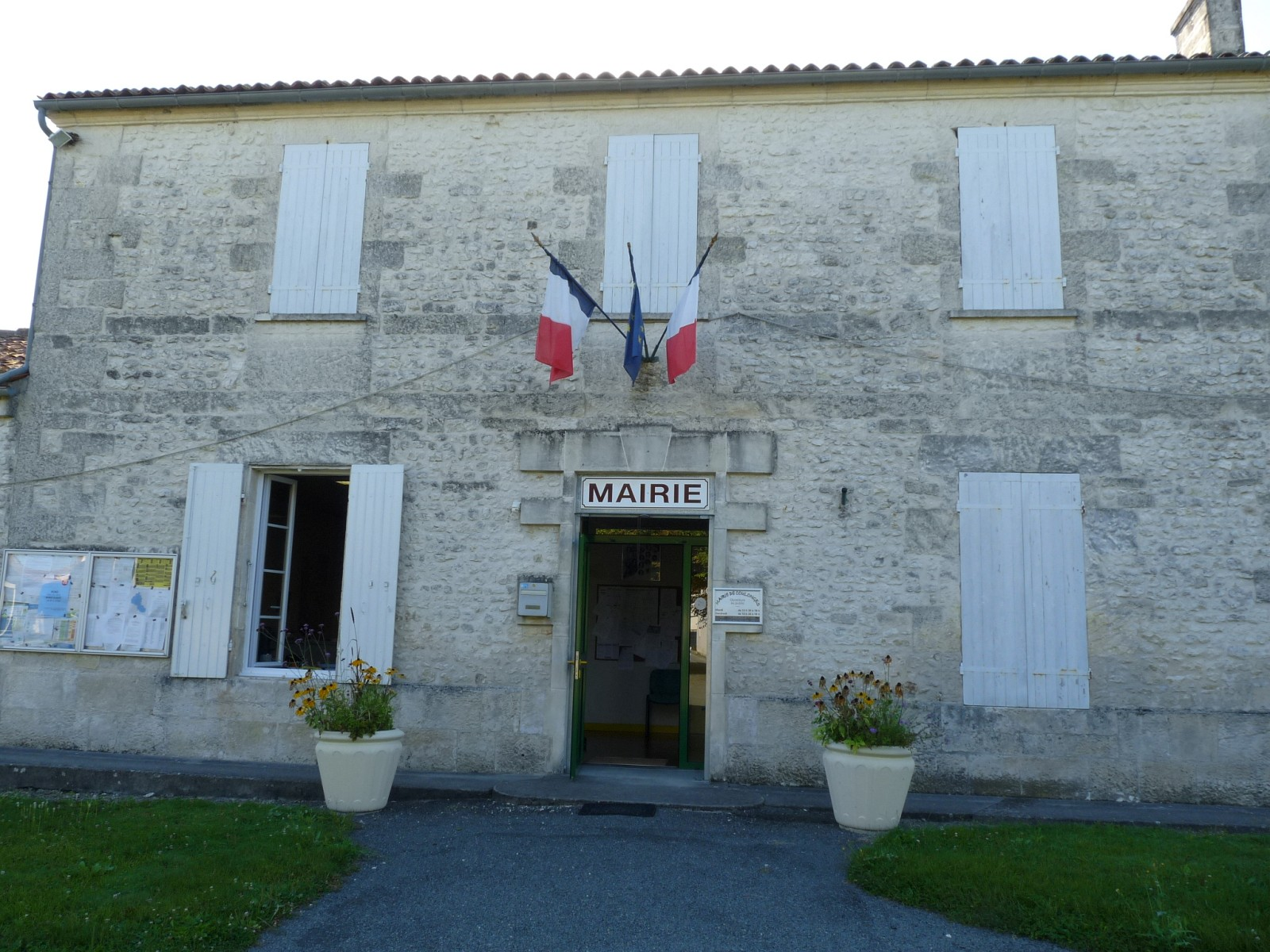
- The town hall in Coulonges
- Location of Coulonges
- Location within France Location within Nouvelle-Aquitaine
- Coordinates: 45°36′37″N 0°25′22″W
- Country: France
- Region: Nouvelle-Aquitaine
- Department: Charente-Maritime
- Arrondissement: Jonzac
- Canton: Thénac

Government
  - Mayor (2020–2026): Franck André
- Area^{1}: 9.16 km^{2} (3.54 sq mi)
- Highest elevation: 65 m (213 ft)
- Lowest elevation: 13 m (43 ft)
- Population (2023): 222
  - Density: 24.2/km^{2} (62.8/sq mi)
- Time zone: UTC+01:00 (CET)
  - Summer (DST): UTC+02:00 (CEST)
- INSEE/Postal code: 17122 /17800
- ^{1} French Land Register data, which excludes lakes, ponds, glaciers > 1 km^{2} (0.386 sq mi or 247 acres) and river estuaries.

Coulonges (French pronunciation: [kulɔ̃ʒ]) is a commune in the Charente-Maritime department in southwestern France.

== Population ==
Historical population
Year	Pop.	±% p.a.
1968	237	—
1975	247	+0.59%
1982	220	−1.64%
1990	193	−1.62%
1999	178	−0.89%
2007	219	+2.62%
2012	246	+2.35%
2017	241	−0.41%
2023	222	−1.36%
Source: INSEE

== See also ==
- Communes of the Charente-Maritime department
