= Berneuil, Charente-Maritime =

Berneuil
- Commune
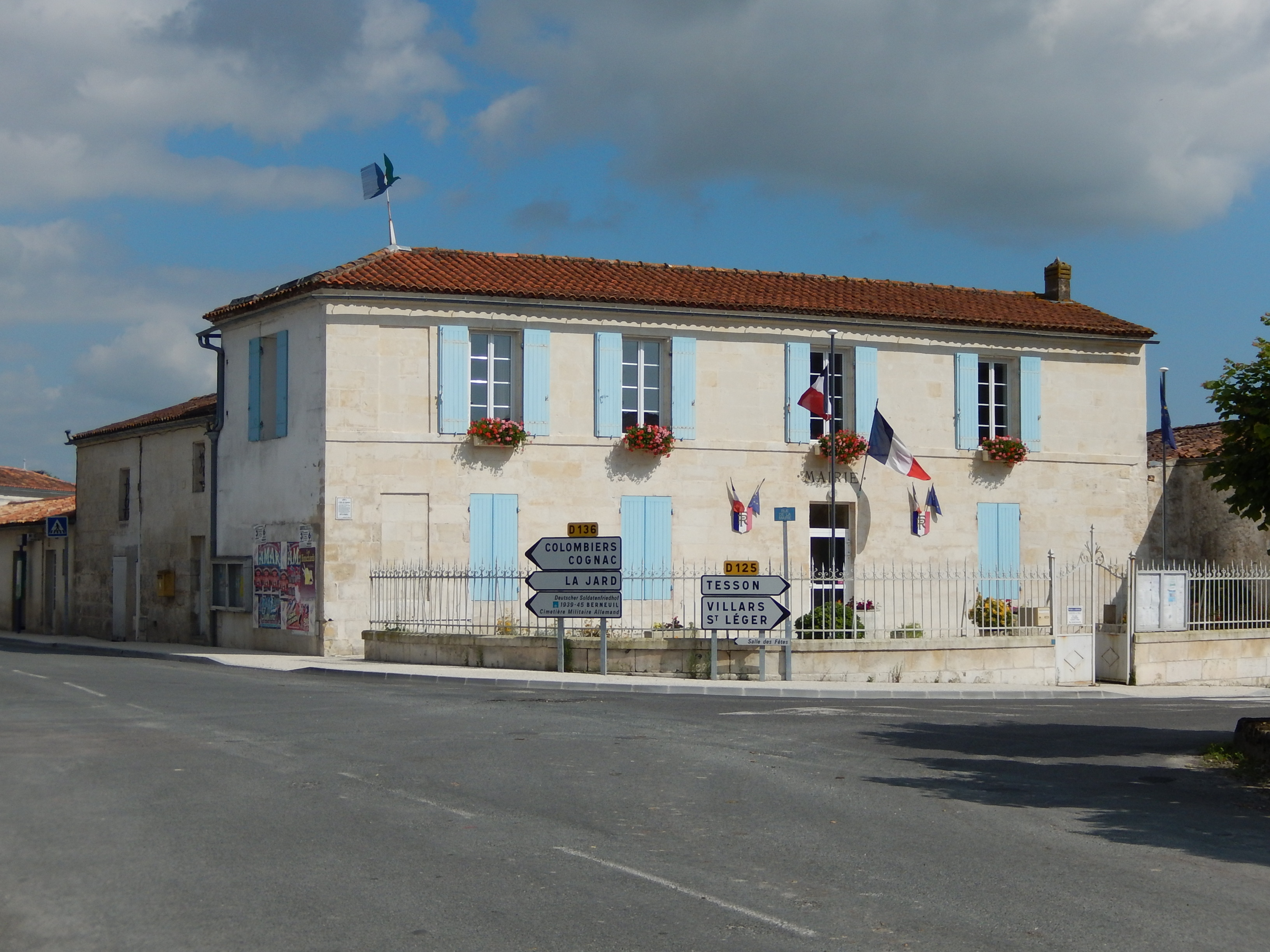
- The town hall in Berneuil
- Location of Berneuil
- Location within France Location within Nouvelle-Aquitaine
- Coordinates: 45°38′38″N 0°35′57″W
- Country: France
- Region: Nouvelle-Aquitaine
- Department: Charente-Maritime
- Arrondissement: Saintes
- Canton: Thénac
- Intercommunality: Gémozac et la Saintonge Viticole

Government
  - Mayor (2020–2026): Jean-Pierre Maurel
- Area^{1}: 25.45 km^{2} (9.83 sq mi)
- Highest elevation: 72 m (236 ft)
- Lowest elevation: 5 m (16 ft)
- Population (2023): 1,169
  - Density: 45.93/km^{2} (119.0/sq mi)
- Time zone: UTC+01:00 (CET)
  - Summer (DST): UTC+02:00 (CEST)
- INSEE/Postal code: 17044 /17460
- ^{1} French Land Register data, which excludes lakes, ponds, glaciers > 1 km^{2} (0.386 sq mi or 247 acres) and river estuaries.

Berneuil (French pronunciation: [bɛʁnœj]) is a commune in the Charente-Maritime department in southwestern France.

== Geography ==
The Seugne forms part of the commune's northeastern border.

== Population ==
Historical population
Year	Pop.	±% p.a.
1968	636	—
1975	595	−0.95%
1982	669	+1.69%
1990	732	+1.13%
1999	836	+1.49%
2007	969	+1.86%
2012	1,121	+2.96%
2017	1,146	+0.44%
2023	1,169	+0.33%
Source: INSEE

== See also ==
- Communes of the Charente-Maritime department
