= La Clisse =

- Commune
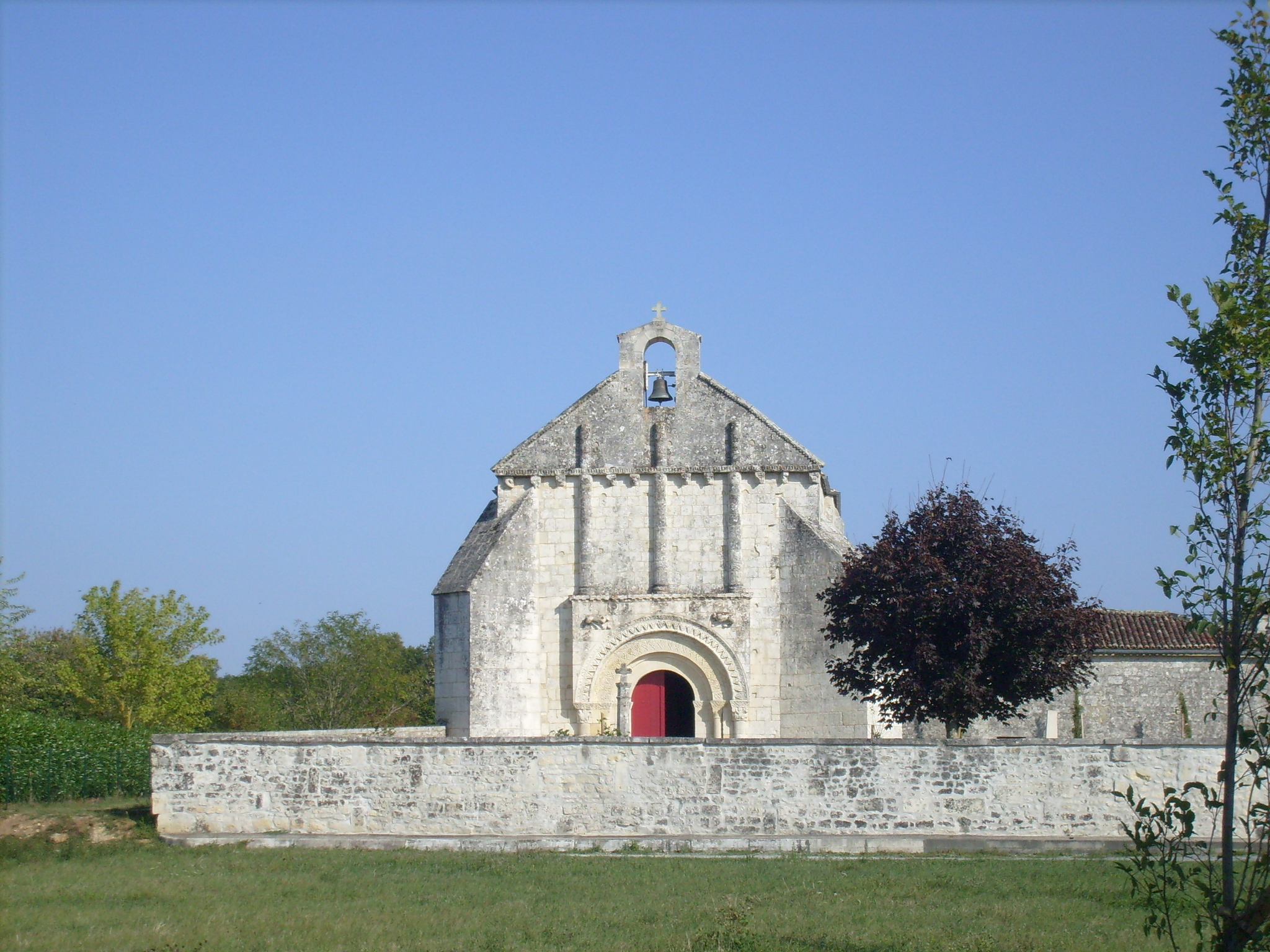
- The church in La Clisse

- Coat of arms
- Location of La Clisse
- Location within France Location within Nouvelle-Aquitaine
- Coordinates: 45°44′33″N 0°45′42″W
- Country: France
- Region: Nouvelle-Aquitaine
- Department: Charente-Maritime
- Arrondissement: Saintes
- Canton: Thénac
- Intercommunality: CA Saintes

Government
  - Mayor (2020–2026): Joseph Daniel de Miniac
- Area^{1}: 5.18 km^{2} (2.00 sq mi)
- Population (2023): 759
  - Density: 147/km^{2} (379/sq mi)
- Time zone: UTC+01:00 (CET)
  - Summer (DST): UTC+02:00 (CEST)
- INSEE/Postal code: 17112 /17600
- ^{1} French Land Register data, which excludes lakes, ponds, glaciers > 1 km^{2} (0.386 sq mi or 247 acres) and river estuaries.

La Clisse (French pronunciation: [la klis]) is a commune in the Charente-Maritime department in southwestern France.

== See also ==
- Communes of the Charente-Maritime department
