= Les Gonds =

- Commune
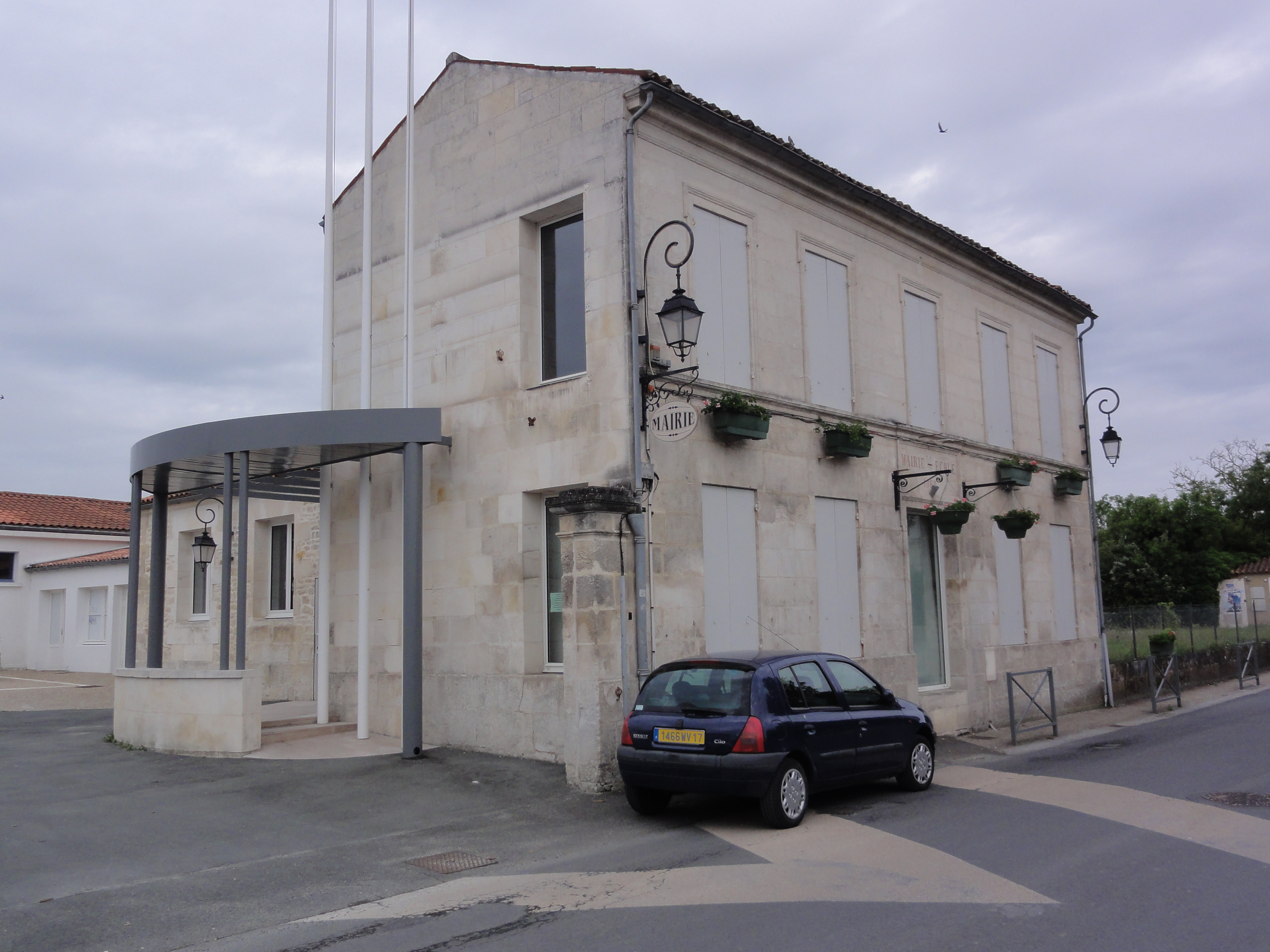
- The town hall in Les Gonds

- Coat of arms
- Location of Les Gonds
- Location within France Location within Nouvelle-Aquitaine
- Coordinates: 45°42′58″N 0°36′56″W
- Country: France
- Region: Nouvelle-Aquitaine
- Department: Charente-Maritime
- Arrondissement: Saintes
- Canton: Thénac
- Intercommunality: CA Saintes

Government
  - Mayor (2020–2026): Alexandre Grenot
- Area^{1}: 12.96 km^{2} (5.00 sq mi)
- Elevation: 12 m (39 ft)
- Highest elevation: 20 m (66 ft)
- Lowest elevation: 2 m (6.6 ft)
- Population (2023): 1,740
  - Density: 134/km^{2} (348/sq mi)
- Time zone: UTC+01:00 (CET)
  - Summer (DST): UTC+02:00 (CEST)
- INSEE/Postal code: 17179 /17100
- ^{1} French Land Register data, which excludes lakes, ponds, glaciers > 1 km^{2} (0.386 sq mi or 247 acres) and river estuaries.

Les Gonds (French pronunciation: [le ɡɔ̃]) is a commune in the Charente-Maritime department in southwestern France.

== Geography ==
The river Seugne forms most of the commune's eastern border, then flows into the Charente, which forms all of its northern border.

== Population ==
Historical population
Year	Pop.	±% p.a.
1968	846	—
1975	869	+0.38%
1982	1,028	+2.43%
1990	1,129	+1.18%
1999	1,241	+1.06%
2007	1,576	+3.03%
2012	1,576	+0.00%
2017	1,726	+1.83%
2023	1,740	+0.13%
Source: INSEE

== See also ==
- Communes of the Charente-Maritime department
