= Saint-Pierre-de-Juillers =

- Commune
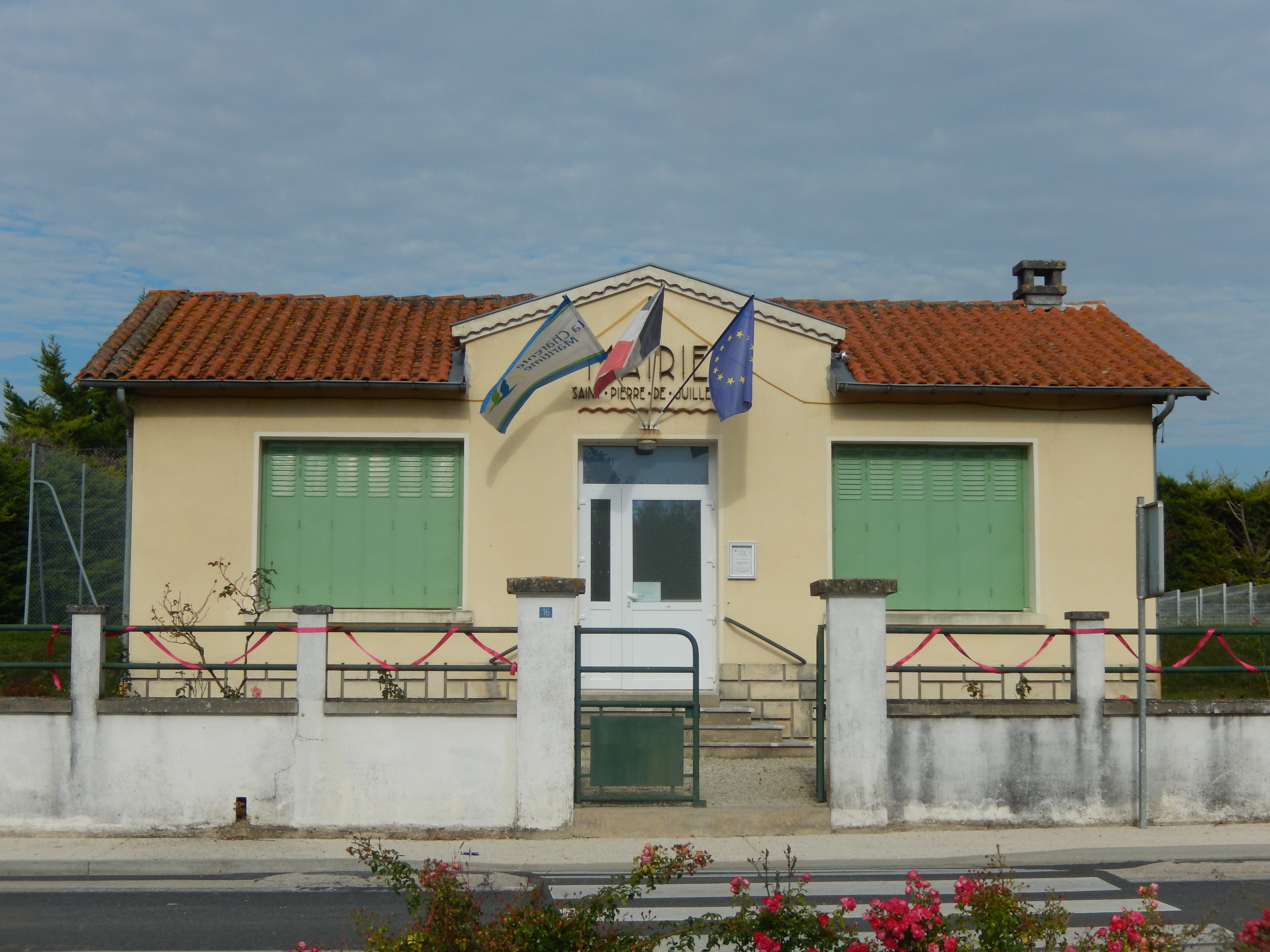
- The town hall in Saint-Pierre-de-Juillers
- Location of Saint-Pierre-de-Juillers
- Location within France Location within Nouvelle-Aquitaine
- Coordinates: 45°56′44″N 0°22′15″W
- Country: France
- Region: Nouvelle-Aquitaine
- Department: Charente-Maritime
- Arrondissement: Saint-Jean-d'Angély
- Canton: Matha

Government
  - Mayor (2020–2026): François Pineau
- Area^{1}: 17.59 km^{2} (6.79 sq mi)
- Elevation: 50 m (160 ft)
- Highest elevation: 108 m (354 ft)
- Lowest elevation: 32 m (105 ft)
- Population (2023): 349
  - Density: 19.8/km^{2} (51.4/sq mi)
- Time zone: UTC+01:00 (CET)
  - Summer (DST): UTC+02:00 (CEST)
- INSEE/Postal code: 17383 /17400
- ^{1} French Land Register data, which excludes lakes, ponds, glaciers > 1 km^{2} (0.386 sq mi or 247 acres) and river estuaries.

Saint-Pierre-de-Juillers (French pronunciation: [sɛ̃ pjɛʁ də ʒɥije]) is a commune in the Charente-Maritime department in southwestern France.

== Population ==
Historical population
Year	Pop.	±% p.a.
1968	473	—
1975	444	−0.90%
1982	379	−2.24%
1990	366	−0.44%
1999	367	+0.03%
2007	375	+0.27%
2012	356	−1.03%
2017	363	+0.39%
2023	349	−0.65%
Source: INSEE

== See also ==
- Communes of the Charente-Maritime department
