= Rétaud =

- Commune
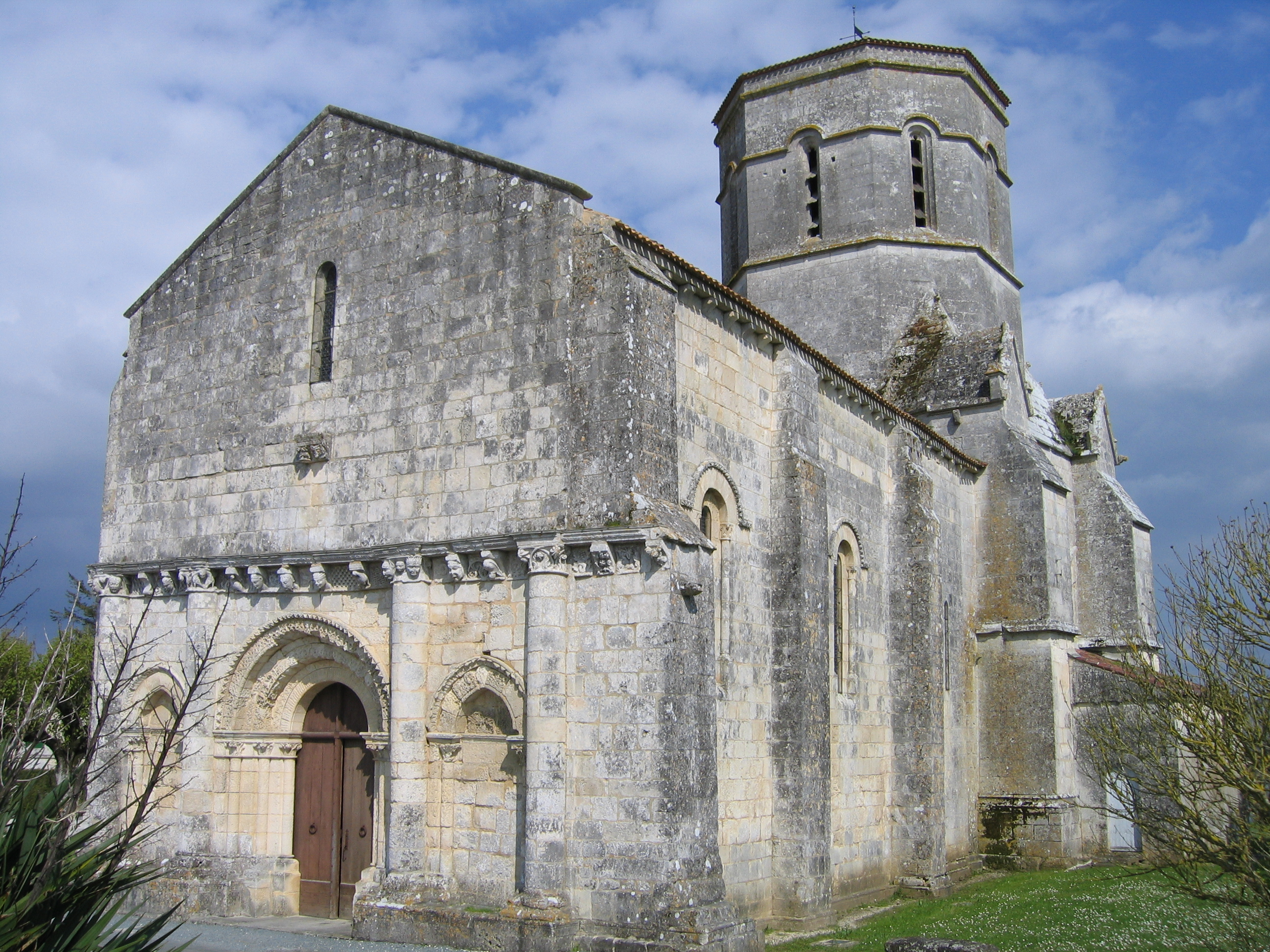
- Romanesque church
- Location of Rétaud
- Location within France Location within Nouvelle-Aquitaine
- Coordinates: 45°40′41″N 0°43′38″W
- Country: France
- Region: Nouvelle-Aquitaine
- Department: Charente-Maritime
- Arrondissement: Saintes
- Canton: Thénac
- Intercommunality: Gémozac et Saintonge Viticole

Government
  - Mayor (2022–2026): Pascal Lavergne
- Area^{1}: 19.92 km^{2} (7.69 sq mi)
- Highest elevation: 49 m (161 ft)
- Lowest elevation: 26 m (85 ft)
- Population (2023): 1,058
  - Density: 53.11/km^{2} (137.6/sq mi)
- Time zone: UTC+01:00 (CET)
  - Summer (DST): UTC+02:00 (CEST)
- INSEE/Postal code: 17296 /17460
- ^{1} French Land Register data, which excludes lakes, ponds, glaciers > 1 km^{2} (0.386 sq mi or 247 acres) and river estuaries.

Rétaud (French pronunciation: [ʁeto]) is a commune in the Charente-Maritime department in southwestern France.

== Population ==
Historical population
Year	Pop.	±% p.a.
1968	739	—
1975	650	−1.82%
1982	740	+1.87%
1990	805	+1.06%
1999	869	+0.85%
2007	948	+1.09%
2012	1,062	+2.30%
2017	1,069	+0.13%
2023	1,058	−0.17%
Source: INSEE

== See also ==
- Communes of the Charente-Maritime department
