= Préguillac =

- Commune
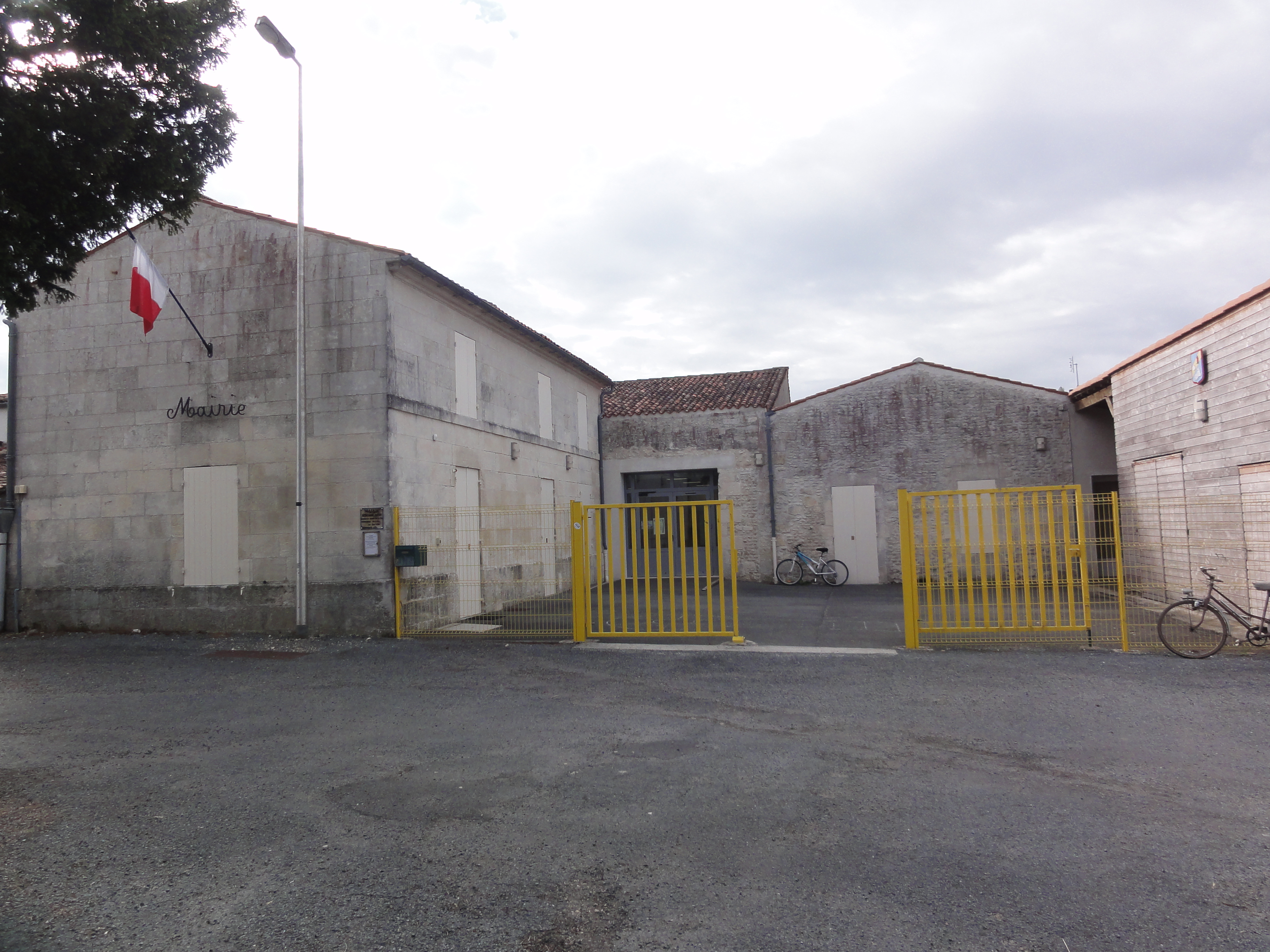
- The town hall in Préguillac

- Coat of arms
- Location of Préguillac
- Location within France Location within Nouvelle-Aquitaine
- Coordinates: 45°40′18″N 0°36′55″W
- Country: France
- Region: Nouvelle-Aquitaine
- Department: Charente-Maritime
- Arrondissement: Saintes
- Canton: Thénac
- Intercommunality: CA Saintes

Government
  - Mayor (2022–2026): Martine Mirande
- Area^{1}: 6.60 km^{2} (2.55 sq mi)
- Elevation: 69 m (226 ft)
- Highest elevation: 69 m (226 ft)
- Lowest elevation: 7 m (23 ft)
- Population (2023): 444
  - Density: 67.3/km^{2} (174/sq mi)
- Time zone: UTC+01:00 (CET)
  - Summer (DST): UTC+02:00 (CEST)
- INSEE/Postal code: 17289 /17460
- ^{1} French Land Register data, which excludes lakes, ponds, glaciers > 1 km^{2} (0.386 sq mi or 247 acres) and river estuaries.

Préguillac (French pronunciation: [pʁeɡijak]) is a commune in the Charente-Maritime department in southwestern France.

As of 2021, the population is estimated to be 431.

== Population ==
Historical population
Year	Pop.	±% p.a.
1968	244	—
1975	243	−0.06%
1982	278	+1.94%
1990	305	+1.17%
1999	323	+0.64%
2007	406	+2.90%
2012	451	+2.12%
2017	450	−0.04%
2023	444	−0.22%
Source: INSEE

== See also ==
- Communes of the Charente-Maritime department
