= Blanzac-lès-Matha =

- Commune
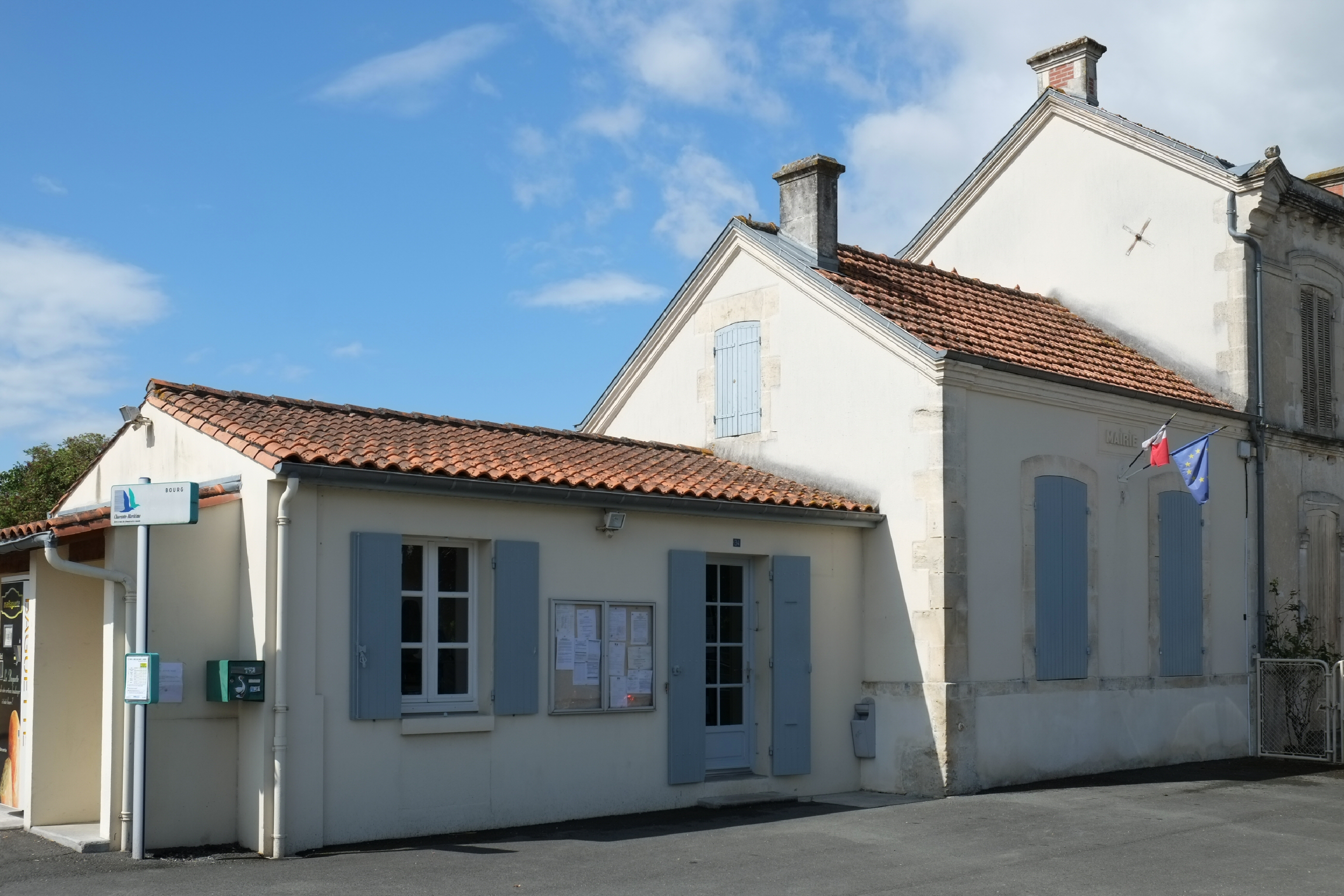
- The town hall in Blanzac-lès-Matha
- Location of Blanzac-lès-Matha
- Location within France Location within Nouvelle-Aquitaine
- Coordinates: 45°52′25″N 0°21′03″W
- Country: France
- Region: Nouvelle-Aquitaine
- Department: Charente-Maritime
- Arrondissement: Saint-Jean-d'Angély
- Canton: Matha

Government
  - Mayor (2020–2026): Pierre Arnaud
- Area^{1}: 9.42 km^{2} (3.64 sq mi)
- Elevation: 45 m (148 ft)
- Highest elevation: 76 m (249 ft)
- Lowest elevation: 23 m (75 ft)
- Population (2023): 345
  - Density: 36.6/km^{2} (94.9/sq mi)
- Time zone: UTC+01:00 (CET)
  - Summer (DST): UTC+02:00 (CEST)
- INSEE/Postal code: 17048 /17160
- ^{1} French Land Register data, which excludes lakes, ponds, glaciers > 1 km^{2} (0.386 sq mi or 247 acres) and river estuaries.

Blanzac-lès-Matha (French pronunciation: [blɑ̃zak lɛ mata], literally Blanzac near Matha) is a commune in the Charente-Maritime department in the Nouvelle-Aquitaine region in southwestern France.

== Population ==
Historical population
Year	Pop.	±% p.a.
1968	263	—
1975	281	+0.95%
1982	268	−0.67%
1990	308	+1.75%
1999	296	−0.44%
2007	326	+1.21%
2012	339	+0.79%
2017	328	−0.66%
2023	345	+0.85%
Source: INSEE

== See also ==
- Communes of the Charente-Maritime department
