= Pessines =

- Commune
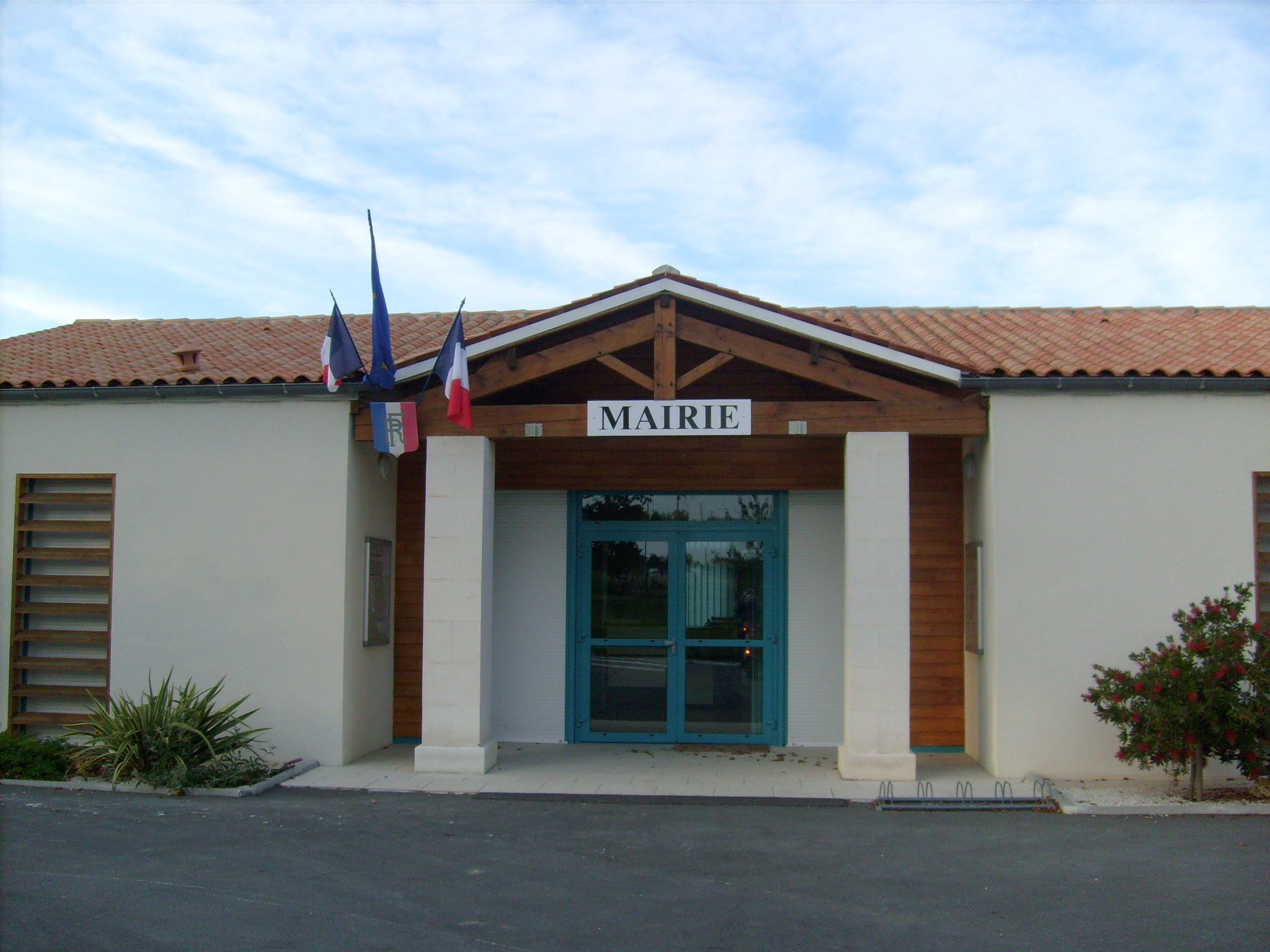
- Town hall
- Location of Pessines
- Location within France Location within Nouvelle-Aquitaine
- Coordinates: 45°43′47″N 0°43′01″W
- Country: France
- Region: Nouvelle-Aquitaine
- Department: Charente-Maritime
- Arrondissement: Saintes
- Canton: Thénac
- Intercommunality: CA Saintes

Government
  - Mayor (2020–2026): Philippe Delhoume
- Area^{1}: 9.05 km^{2} (3.49 sq mi)
- Highest elevation: 71 m (233 ft)
- Lowest elevation: 24 m (79 ft)
- Population (2023): 796
  - Density: 88.0/km^{2} (228/sq mi)
- Time zone: UTC+01:00 (CET)
  - Summer (DST): UTC+02:00 (CEST)
- INSEE/Postal code: 17275 /17810
- ^{1} French Land Register data, which excludes lakes, ponds, glaciers > 1 km^{2} (0.386 sq mi or 247 acres) and river estuaries.

Pessines (French pronunciation: [pesin]) is a commune in the Charente-Maritime department in southwestern France.

== Population ==
Historical population
Year	Pop.	±% p.a.
1968	218	—
1975	274	+3.32%
1982	406	+5.78%
1990	566	+4.24%
1999	648	+1.51%
2007	770	+2.18%
2012	785	+0.39%
2017	745	−1.04%
2023	796	+1.11%
Source: INSEE

== See also ==
- Communes of the Charente-Maritime department
