= Pérignac, Charente-Maritime =

Pérignac
- Commune
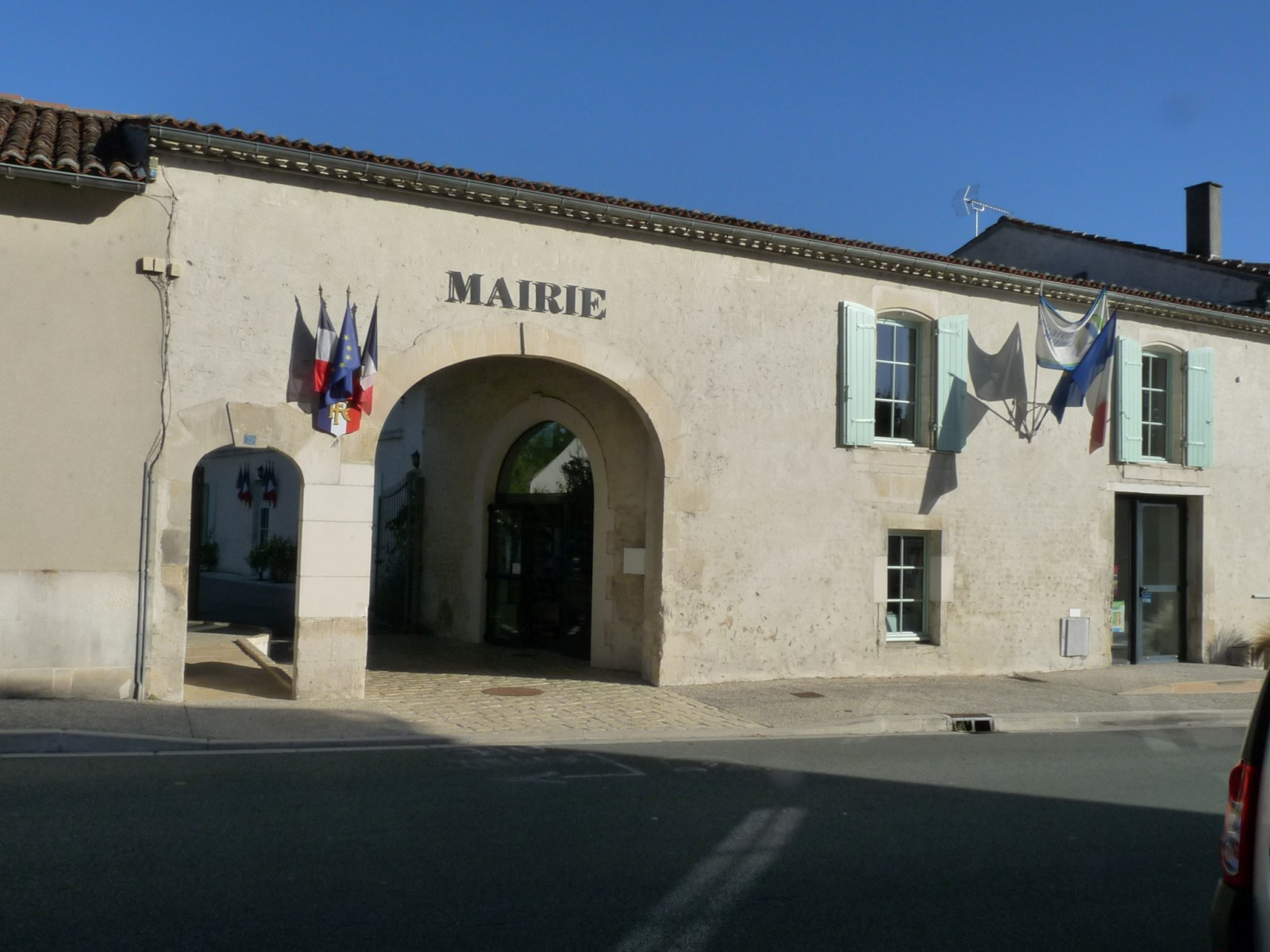
- The town hall in Pérignac
- Location of Pérignac
- Location within France Location within Nouvelle-Aquitaine
- Coordinates: 45°37′28″N 0°27′46″W
- Country: France
- Region: Nouvelle-Aquitaine
- Department: Charente-Maritime
- Arrondissement: Jonzac
- Canton: Thénac

Government
  - Mayor (2020–2026): Christian Dugué
- Area^{1}: 27.56 km^{2} (10.64 sq mi)
- Highest elevation: 91 m (299 ft)
- Lowest elevation: 3 m (9.8 ft)
- Population (2023): 965
  - Density: 35.0/km^{2} (90.7/sq mi)
- Time zone: UTC+01:00 (CET)
  - Summer (DST): UTC+02:00 (CEST)
- INSEE/Postal code: 17273 /17800
- ^{1} French Land Register data, which excludes lakes, ponds, glaciers > 1 km^{2} (0.386 sq mi or 247 acres) and river estuaries.

Pérignac (French pronunciation: [peʁiɲak]) is a commune in the Charente-Maritime department in southwestern France.

== Population ==
Historical population
Year	Pop.	±% p.a.
1968	907	—
1975	878	−0.46%
1982	867	−0.18%
1990	964	+1.33%
1999	966	+0.02%
2007	975	+0.12%
2012	995	+0.41%
2017	1,017	+0.44%
2023	965	−0.87%
Source: INSEE

== See also ==
- Communes of the Charente-Maritime department
