= Communes of the Charente-Maritime department =

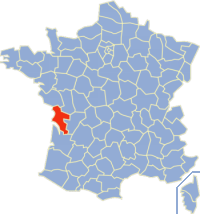

The following is a list of the 462 communes of the Charente-Maritime department of France.

The communes cooperate in the following intercommunalities (as of 2025):

- Communauté d'agglomération Rochefort Océan
- Communauté d'agglomération de La Rochelle
- Communauté d'agglomération Royan Atlantique
- Communauté d'agglomération de Saintes
- Communauté de communes Aunis Atlantique
- Communauté de communes Aunis Sud
- Communauté de communes du Bassin de Marennes
- Communauté de communes Cœur de Saintonge
- Communauté de communes de Gémozac et de la Saintonge Viticole
- Communauté de communes de la Haute-Saintonge
- Communauté de communes de l'Île-de-Ré
- Communauté de communes de l'Île-d'Oléron
- Communauté de communes des Vals de Saintonge

INSEE	Postal	Commune
17002	17500	Agudelle
17003	17290	Aigrefeuille-d'Aunis
17005	17150	Allas-Bocage
17006	17500	Allas-Champagne
17007	17540	Anais
17008	17230	Andilly
17009	17540	Angliers
17010	17690	Angoulins
17011	17350	Annepont
17012	17380	Annezay
17013	17400	Antezant-la-Chapelle
17015	17120	Arces
17016	17520	Archiac
17017	17380	Archingeay
17018	17290	Ardillières
17019	17590	Ars-en-Ré
17020	17520	Arthenac
17021	17530	Arvert
17022	17400	Asnières-la-Giraud
17023	17770	Aujac
17024	17470	Aulnay
17025	17770	Aumagne
17026	17770	Authon-Ébéon
17027	17800	Avy
17028	17440	Aytré
17029	17160	Bagnizeau
17030	17600	Balanzac
17031	17160	Ballans
17032	17290	Ballon
17033	17360	La Barde
17034	17120	Barzan
17035	17490	Bazauges
17036	17620	Beaugeay
17037	17490	Beauvais-sur-Matha
17038	17210	Bedenac
17039	17800	Belluire
17041	17170	Benon
17042	17770	Bercloux
17043	17330	Bernay-Saint-Martin
17044	17460	Berneuil
17045	17250	Beurlay
17046	17400	Bignay
17047	17800	Biron
17048	17160	Blanzac-lès-Matha
17049	17470	Blanzay-sur-Boutonne
17050	17240	Bois
17051	17580	Le Bois-Plage-en-Ré
17052	17150	Boisredon
17053	17430	Bords
17054	17270	Boresse-et-Martron
17055	17360	Boscamnant
17056	17800	Bougneau
17057	17540	Bouhet
17058	17560	Bourcefranc-le-Chapus
17059	17220	Bourgneuf
17060	17120	Boutenac-Touvent
17061	17210	Bran
17486	17840	La Brée-les-Bains
17062	17490	Bresdon
17063	17700	Breuil-la-Réorte
17064	17920	Breuillet
17065	17870	Breuil-Magné
17066	17520	Brie-sous-Archiac
17067	17160	Brie-sous-Matha
17068	17120	Brie-sous-Mortagne
17069	17800	Brives-sur-Charente
17070	17770	Brizambourg
17071	17160	La Brousse
17072	17770	Burie
17074	17210	Bussac-Forêt
17073	17100	Bussac-sur-Charente
17075	17430	Cabariot
17076	17520	Celles
17077	17270	Cercoux
17078	17800	Chadenac
17079	17890	Chaillevette
17080	17290	Chambon
17081	17130	Chamouillac
17082	17500	Champagnac
17083	17620	Champagne
17084	17240	Champagnolles
17085	17430	Champdolent
17086	17610	Chaniers
17087	17380	Chantemerle-sur-la-Soie
17089	17100	La Chapelle-des-Pots
17091	17230	Charron
17092	17130	Chartuzac
17093	17480	Le Château-d'Oléron
17094	17340	Châtelaillon-Plage
17095	17210	Chatenet
17096	17130	Chaunac
17097	17600	Le Chay
17098	17120	Chenac-Saint-Seurin-d'Uzet
17099	17210	Chepniers
17100	17610	Chérac
17101	17470	Cherbonnières
17102	17460	Chermignac
17104	17210	Chevanceaux
17105	17510	Chives
17106	17520	Cierzac
17107	17290	Ciré-d'Aunis
17108	17500	Clam
17109	17220	Clavette
17110	17270	Clérac
17111	17240	Clion
17112	17600	La Clisse
17113	17360	La Clotte
17114	17330	Coivert
17115	17460	Colombiers
17116	17150	Consac
17117	17470	Contré
17118	17130	Corignac
17119	17600	Corme-Écluse
17120	17600	Corme-Royal
17121	17670	La Couarde-sur-Mer
17122	17800	Coulonges
17124	17330	Courant
17125	17400	Courcelles
17126	17160	Courcerac
17127	17170	Courçon
17128	17100	Courcoury
17129	17130	Courpignac
17130	17130	Coux
17131	17120	Cozes
17132	17170	Cramchaban
17133	17260	Cravans
17134	17350	Crazannes
17135	17160	Cressé
17136	17220	Croix-Chapeau
17137	17330	La Croix-Comtesse
17138	17470	Dampierre-sur-Boutonne
17457	17700	La Devise
17139	17330	Dœuil-sur-le-Mignon
17140	17550	Dolus-d'Oléron
17141	17610	Dompierre-sur-Charente
17142	17139	Dompierre-sur-Mer
17143	17100	Le Douhet
17145	17800	Échebrune
17146	17620	Échillais
17147	17770	Écoyeux
17148	17810	Écurat
17149	17510	Les Éduts
17150	17400	Les Églises-d'Argenteuil
17151	17600	L'Éguille
17152	17120	Épargnes
17153	17137	Esnandes
17154	17250	Les Essards
17277	17400	Essouvert
17155	17750	Étaules
17156	17130	Expiremont
17157	17350	Fenioux
17158	17170	Ferrières
17159	17800	Fléac-sur-Seugne
17160	17120	Floirac
17161	17630	La Flotte
17162	17510	Fontaine-Chalendray
17163	17500	Fontaines-d'Ozillac
17164	17100	Fontcouverte
17165	17400	Fontenet
17166	17290	Forges
17167	17270	Le Fouilloux
17168	17450	Fouras
17171	17250	Geay
17172	17260	Gémozac
17173	17360	La Genétouze
17174	17430	Genouillé
17175	17520	Germignac
17176	17160	Gibourne
17177	17160	Le Gicq
17178	17260	Givrezac
17179	17100	Les Gonds
17180	17490	Gourvillette
17181	17350	Grandjean
17485	17370	Le Grand-Village-Plage
17182	17170	La Grève-sur-Mignon
17183	17120	Grézac
17184	17620	La Gripperie-Saint-Symphorien
17185	17600	Le Gua
17186	17540	Le Gué-d'Alleré
17187	17500	Guitinières
17188	17160	Haimps
17190	17137	L'Houmeau
17004	17123	Île-d'Aix
17191	17460	La Jard
17192	17520	Jarnac-Champagne
17193	17220	La Jarne
17194	17220	La Jarrie
17195	17330	La Jarrie-Audouin
17196	17260	Jazennes
17197	17500	Jonzac
17198	17770	Juicq
17199	17130	Jussas
17200	17140	Lagord
17201	17170	La Laigne
17202	17380	Landes
17203	17290	Landrais
17204	17500	Léoville
17205	17870	Loire-les-Marais
17206	17470	Loiré-sur-Nie
17207	17111	Loix
17208	17230	Longèves
17209	17520	Lonzac
17210	17240	Lorignac
17211	17330	Loulay
17212	17160	Louzignac
17213	17330	Lozay
17214	17600	Luchat
17215	17500	Lussac
17216	17430	Lussant
17217	17490	Macqueville
17218	17230	Marans
17219	17320	Marennes-Hiers-Brouage
17220	17800	Marignac
17221	17700	Marsais
17222	17137	Marsilly
17223	17490	Massac
17224	17160	Matha
17225	17570	Les Mathes
17226	17400	Mazeray
17227	17800	Mazerolles
17228	17600	Médis
17229	17210	Mérignac
17230	17132	Meschers-sur-Gironde
17231	17130	Messac
17232	17120	Meursac
17233	17500	Meux
17234	17330	Migré
17235	17770	Migron
17236	17150	Mirambeau
17237	17780	Moëze
17239	17160	Mons
17240	17130	Montendre
17241	17270	Montguyon

INSEE	Postal	Commune
17242	17800	Montils
17243	17210	Montlieu-la-Garde
17244	17260	Montpellier-de-Médillan
17245	17220	Montroy
17246	17430	Moragne
17247	17113	Mornac-sur-Seudre
17248	17120	Mortagne-sur-Gironde
17249	17500	Mortiers
17250	17240	Mosnac
17252	17350	Le Mung
17253	17430	Muron
17254	17380	Nachamps
17255	17600	Nancras
17256	17770	Nantillé
17257	17510	Néré
17258	17520	Neuillac
17259	17500	Neulles
17260	17270	Neuvicq
17261	17490	Neuvicq-le-Château
17262	17810	Nieul-lès-Saintes
17265	17600	Nieulle-sur-Seudre
17263	17150	Nieul-le-Virouil
17264	17137	Nieul-sur-Mer
17266	17380	Les Nouillers
17267	17540	Nuaillé-d'Aunis
17269	17210	Orignolles
17270	17500	Ozillac
17271	17470	Paillé
17273	17800	Pérignac
17274	17180	Périgny
17275	17810	Pessines
17276	17210	Le Pin
17278	17600	Pisany
17279	17240	Plassac
17280	17250	Plassay
17281	17210	Polignac
17282	17130	Pommiers-Moulons
17283	17800	Pons
17284	17250	Pont-l'Abbé-d'Arnoult
17285	17350	Port-d'Envaux
17484	17730	Port-des-Barques
17286	17880	Les Portes-en-Ré
17287	17210	Pouillac
17288	17400	Poursay-Garnaud
17289	17460	Préguillac
17290	17160	Prignac
17291	17138	Puilboreau
17292	17380	Puy-du-Lac
17293	17700	Puyravault
17294	17380	Puyrolland
17295	17500	Réaux-sur-Trèfle
17296	17460	Rétaud
17298	17460	Rioux
17297	17940	Rivedoux-Plage
17268	17470	Rives-de-Boutonne
17299	17300	Rochefort
17300	17000	La Rochelle
17301	17510	Romazières
17302	17250	Romegoux
17303	17170	La Ronde
17304	17800	Rouffiac
17305	17130	Rouffignac
17306	17200	Royan
17307	17600	Sablonceaux
17308	17620	Saint-Agnant
17309	17360	Saint-Aigulin
17310	17260	Saint-André-de-Lidon
17311	17570	Saint-Augustin
17312	17150	Saint-Bonnet-sur-Gironde
17313	17770	Saint-Bris-des-Bois
17314	17770	Saint-Césaire
17315	17220	Saint-Christophe
17316	17520	Saint-Ciers-Champagne
17317	17240	Saint-Ciers-du-Taillon
17318	17590	Saint-Clément-des-Baleines
17320	17430	Saint-Coutant-le-Grand
17321	17380	Saint-Crépin
17322	17170	Saint-Cyr-du-Doret
17323	17650	Saint-Denis-d'Oléron
17324	17150	Saint-Dizant-du-Bois
17325	17240	Saint-Dizant-du-Gua
17319	17210	Sainte-Colombe
17330	17250	Sainte-Gemme
17355	17520	Sainte-Lheurine
17360	17740	Sainte-Marie-de-Ré
17374	17770	Sainte-Même
17389	17250	Sainte-Radegonde
17390	17240	Sainte-Ramée
17415	17100	Saintes
17407	17220	Sainte-Soulle
17326	17520	Saint-Eugène
17327	17330	Saint-Félix
17328	17240	Saint-Fort-sur-Gironde
17329	17780	Saint-Froult
17331	17240	Saint-Genis-de-Saintonge
17332	17240	Saint-Georges-Antignac
17333	17110	Saint-Georges-de-Didonne
17335	17150	Saint-Georges-des-Agoûts
17336	17810	Saint-Georges-des-Coteaux
17337	17190	Saint-Georges-d'Oléron
17338	17700	Saint-Georges-du-Bois
17339	17500	Saint-Germain-de-Lusignan
17341	17500	Saint-Germain-de-Vibrac
17342	17240	Saint-Germain-du-Seudre
17343	17240	Saint-Grégoire-d'Ardennes
17344	17770	Saint-Hilaire-de-Villefranche
17345	17500	Saint-Hilaire-du-Bois
17346	17430	Saint-Hippolyte
17347	17400	Saint-Jean-d'Angély
17348	17620	Saint-Jean-d'Angle
17349	17170	Saint-Jean-de-Liversay
17350	17400	Saint-Julien-de-l'Escap
17351	17320	Saint-Just-Luzac
17353	17450	Saint-Laurent-de-la-Prée
17354	17800	Saint-Léger
17356	17380	Saint-Loup
17357	17520	Saint-Maigrin
17358	17470	Saint-Mandé-sur-Brédoire
17359	17700	Saint-Mard
17361	17330	Saint-Martial
17362	17150	Saint-Martial-de-Mirambeau
17363	17500	Saint-Martial-de-Vitaterne
17364	17520	Saint-Martial-sur-Né
17365	17270	Saint-Martin-d'Ary
17366	17360	Saint-Martin-de-Coux
17367	17400	Saint-Martin-de-Juillers
17369	17410	Saint-Martin-de-Ré
17372	17500	Saint-Médard
17373	17220	Saint-Médard-d'Aunis
17375	17780	Saint-Nazaire-sur-Charente
17376	17230	Saint-Ouen-d'Aunis
17377	17490	Saint-Ouen-la-Thène
17378	17210	Saint-Palais-de-Négrignac
17379	17800	Saint-Palais-de-Phiolin
17380	17420	Saint-Palais-sur-Mer
17381	17400	Saint-Pardoult
17382	17700	Saint-Pierre-d'Amilly
17383	17400	Saint-Pierre-de-Juillers
17384	17330	Saint-Pierre-de-l'Isle
17385	17310	Saint-Pierre-d'Oléron
17386	17270	Saint-Pierre-du-Palais
17340	17700	Saint-Pierre-la-Noue
17387	17250	Saint-Porchaire
17388	17800	Saint-Quantin-de-Rançanne
17391	17220	Saint-Rogatien
17393	17600	Saint-Romain-de-Benet
17394	17700	Saint-Saturnin-du-Bois
17395	17610	Saint-Sauvant
17396	17540	Saint-Sauveur-d'Aunis
17397	17350	Saint-Savinien
17398	17800	Saint-Seurin-de-Palenne
17400	17800	Saint-Sever-de-Saintonge
17401	17330	Saint-Séverin-sur-Boutonne
17402	17240	Saint-Sigismond-de-Clermont
17403	17500	Saint-Simon-de-Bordes
17404	17260	Saint-Simon-de-Pellouaille
17405	17150	Saint-Sorlin-de-Conac
17406	17600	Saint-Sornin
17408	17250	Saint-Sulpice-d'Arnoult
17409	17200	Saint-Sulpice-de-Royan
17410	17150	Saint-Thomas-de-Conac
17411	17370	Saint-Trojan-les-Bains
17412	17100	Saint-Vaize
17413	17220	Saint-Vivien
17414	17138	Saint-Xandre
17416	17510	Saleignes
17417	17130	Salignac-de-Mirambeau
17418	17800	Salignac-sur-Charente
17420	17220	Salles-sur-Mer
17421	17600	Saujon
17422	17510	Seigné
17423	17150	Semillac
17424	17150	Semoussac
17425	17120	Semussac
17426	17770	Le Seure
17427	17490	Siecq
17428	17160	Sonnac
17429	17780	Soubise
17430	17150	Soubran
17431	17250	Soulignonne
17432	17130	Souméras
17433	17130	Sousmoulins
17434	17700	Surgères
17435	17350	Taillant
17436	17350	Taillebourg
17437	17120	Talmont-sur-Gironde
17438	17260	Tanzac
17439	17170	Taugon
17440	17400	Ternant
17441	17460	Tesson
17442	17120	Thaims
17443	17290	Thairé
17444	17460	Thénac
17445	17600	Thézac
17446	17160	Thors
17447	17290	Le Thou
17448	17380	Tonnay-Boutonne
17449	17430	Tonnay-Charente
17450	17380	Torxé
17451	17160	Les Touches-de-Périgny
17452	17390	La Tremblade
17453	17250	Trizay
17454	17130	Tugéras-Saint-Maurice
17455	17250	La Vallée
17458	17500	Vanzac
17459	17400	Varaize
17460	17460	Varzay
17461	17640	Vaux-sur-Mer
17462	17100	Vénérand
17463	17300	Vergeroux
17464	17330	Vergné
17465	17400	La Vergne
17466	17540	Vérines
17467	17400	Vervant
17468	17130	Vibrac
17469	17260	Villars-en-Pons
17470	17770	Villars-les-Bois
17471	17470	La Villedieu
17472	17230	Villedoux
17473	17470	Villemorin
17474	17330	Villeneuve-la-Comtesse
17476	17500	Villexavier
17477	17510	Villiers-Couture
17478	17510	Vinax
17479	17260	Virollet
17480	17290	Virson
17481	17400	Voissay
17482	17700	Vouhé
17483	17340	Yves
