= Salignac-sur-Charente =

- Commune
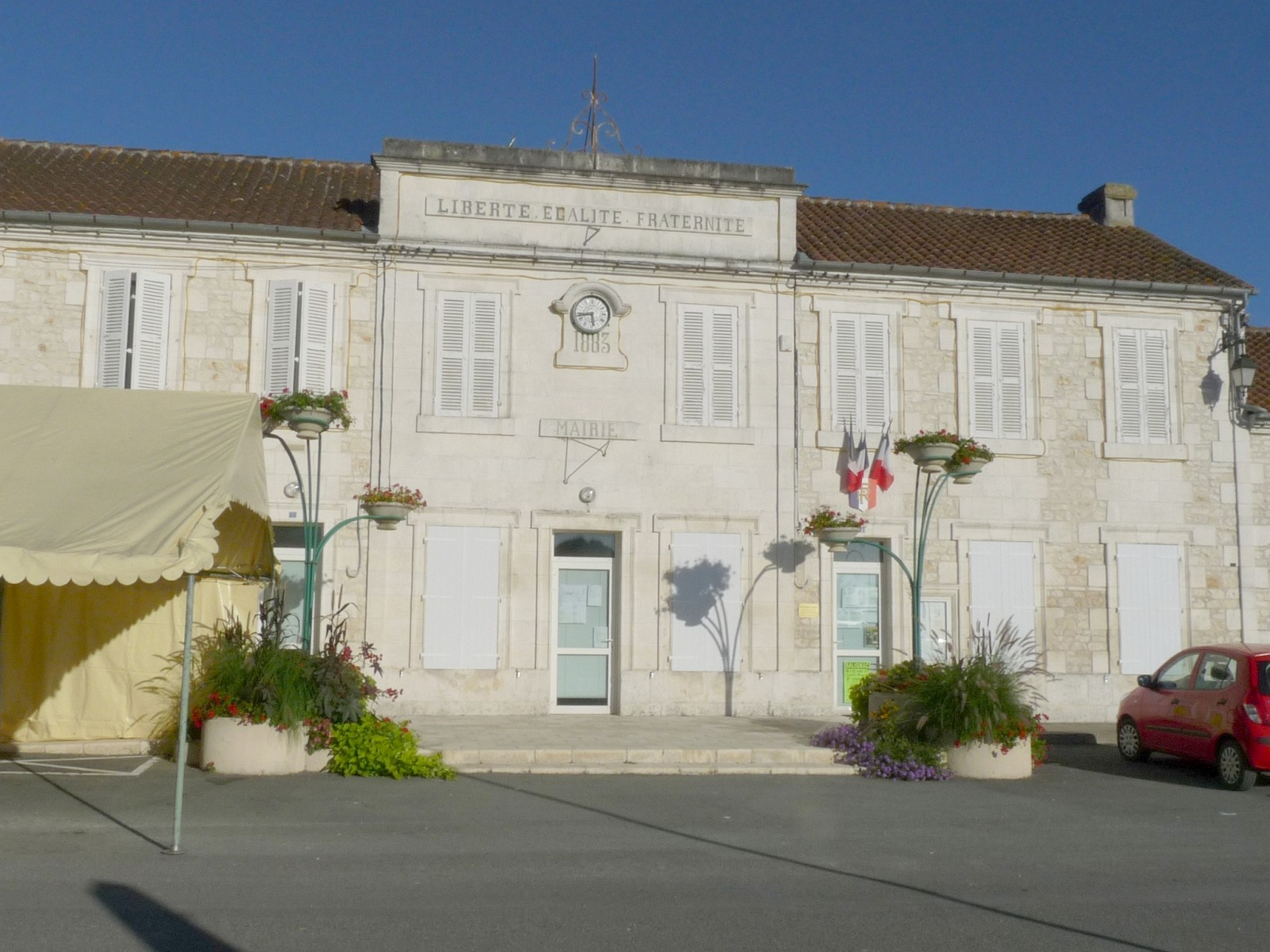
- The town hall in Salignac-sur-Charente
- Location of Salignac-sur-Charente
- Location within France Location within Nouvelle-Aquitaine
- Coordinates: 45°40′22″N 0°25′19″W
- Country: France
- Region: Nouvelle-Aquitaine
- Department: Charente-Maritime
- Arrondissement: Jonzac
- Canton: Thénac

Government
  - Mayor (2020–2026): Jean-Michel Marchais
- Area^{1}: 10.22 km^{2} (3.95 sq mi)
- Highest elevation: 22 m (72 ft)
- Lowest elevation: 2 m (6.6 ft)
- Population (2023): 606
  - Density: 59.3/km^{2} (154/sq mi)
- Time zone: UTC+01:00 (CET)
  - Summer (DST): UTC+02:00 (CEST)
- INSEE/Postal code: 17418 /17800
- ^{1} French Land Register data, which excludes lakes, ponds, glaciers > 1 km^{2} (0.386 sq mi or 247 acres) and river estuaries.

Salignac-sur-Charente (French pronunciation: [saliɲak syʁ ʃaʁɑ̃t], literally Salignac on Charente) is a commune in the Charente-Maritime department in southwestern France.

== Population ==
Historical population
Year	Pop.	±% p.a.
1968	542	—
1975	494	−1.32%
1982	485	−0.26%
1990	504	+0.48%
1999	545	+0.87%
2007	626	+1.75%
2012	623	−0.10%
2017	599	−0.78%
2023	606	+0.19%
Source: INSEE

== See also ==
- Communes of the Charente-Maritime department
