= Brives-sur-Charente =

- Commune
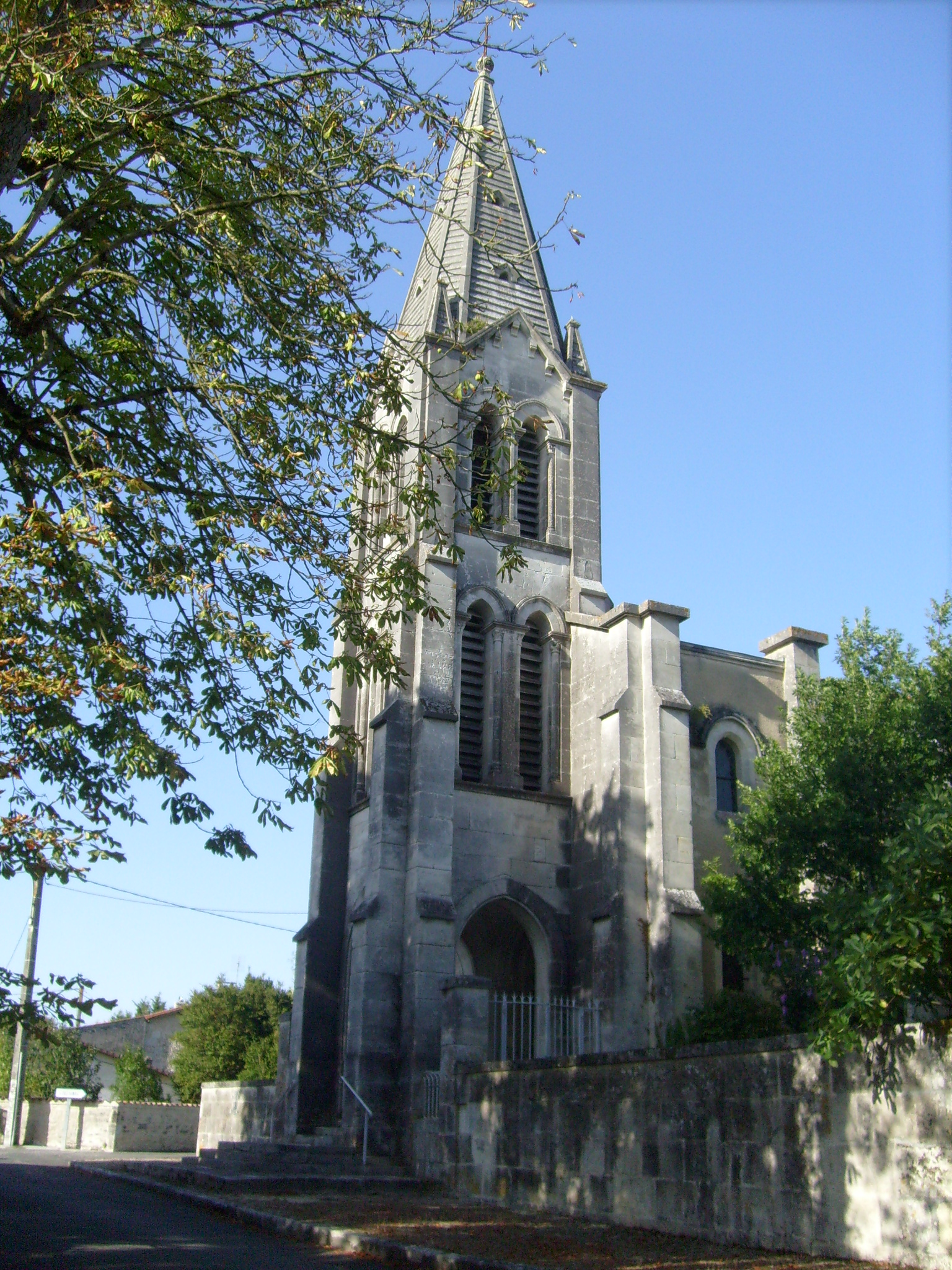
- The church in Brives-sur-Charente
- Location of Brives-sur-Charente
- Location within France Location within Nouvelle-Aquitaine
- Coordinates: 45°40′16″N 0°27′39″W
- Country: France
- Region: Nouvelle-Aquitaine
- Department: Charente-Maritime
- Arrondissement: Jonzac
- Canton: Thénac

Government
  - Mayor (2020–2026): Cécile Biron
- Area^{1}: 5.94 km^{2} (2.29 sq mi)
- Highest elevation: 37 m (121 ft)
- Lowest elevation: 2 m (6.6 ft)
- Population (2023): 213
  - Density: 35.9/km^{2} (92.9/sq mi)
- Time zone: UTC+01:00 (CET)
  - Summer (DST): UTC+02:00 (CEST)
- INSEE/Postal code: 17069 /17800
- ^{1} French Land Register data, which excludes lakes, ponds, glaciers > 1 km^{2} (0.386 sq mi or 247 acres) and river estuaries.

Brives-sur-Charente (French pronunciation: [bʁiv syʁ ʃaʁɑ̃t], literally Brives on Charente, before 1962: Brives) is a commune in the Charente-Maritime department in the Nouvelle-Aquitaine region in southwestern France.

== Population ==
Historical population
Year	Pop.	±% p.a.
1968	198	—
1975	210	+0.84%
1982	208	−0.14%
1990	176	−2.07%
1999	198	+1.32%
2007	226	+1.67%
2012	244	+1.54%
2017	233	−0.92%
2023	213	−1.48%
Source: INSEE

== See also ==
- Communes of the Charente-Maritime department
