= Canton of Thénac =

Administrative unit in Charente-Maritime, France

Coordinates: 45.67°N 0.65°W

The canton of Thénac is an administrative division of the Charente-Maritime department, western France. It was created at the French canton reorganisation which came into effect in March 2015. Its seat is in Thénac.

It consists of the following communes:

1. Berneuil
2. Brives-sur-Charente
3. Chermignac
4. La Clisse
5. Colombiers
6. Corme-Royal
7. Coulonges
8. Courcoury
9. Les Gonds
10. La Jard
11. Luchat
12. Montils
13. Pérignac
14. Pessines
15. Pisany
16. Préguillac
17. Rétaud
18. Rioux
19. Rouffiac
20. Saint-Sever-de-Saintonge
21. Salignac-sur-Charente
22. Tesson
23. Thénac
24. Thézac
25. Varzay
