= Pisany =

- Commune
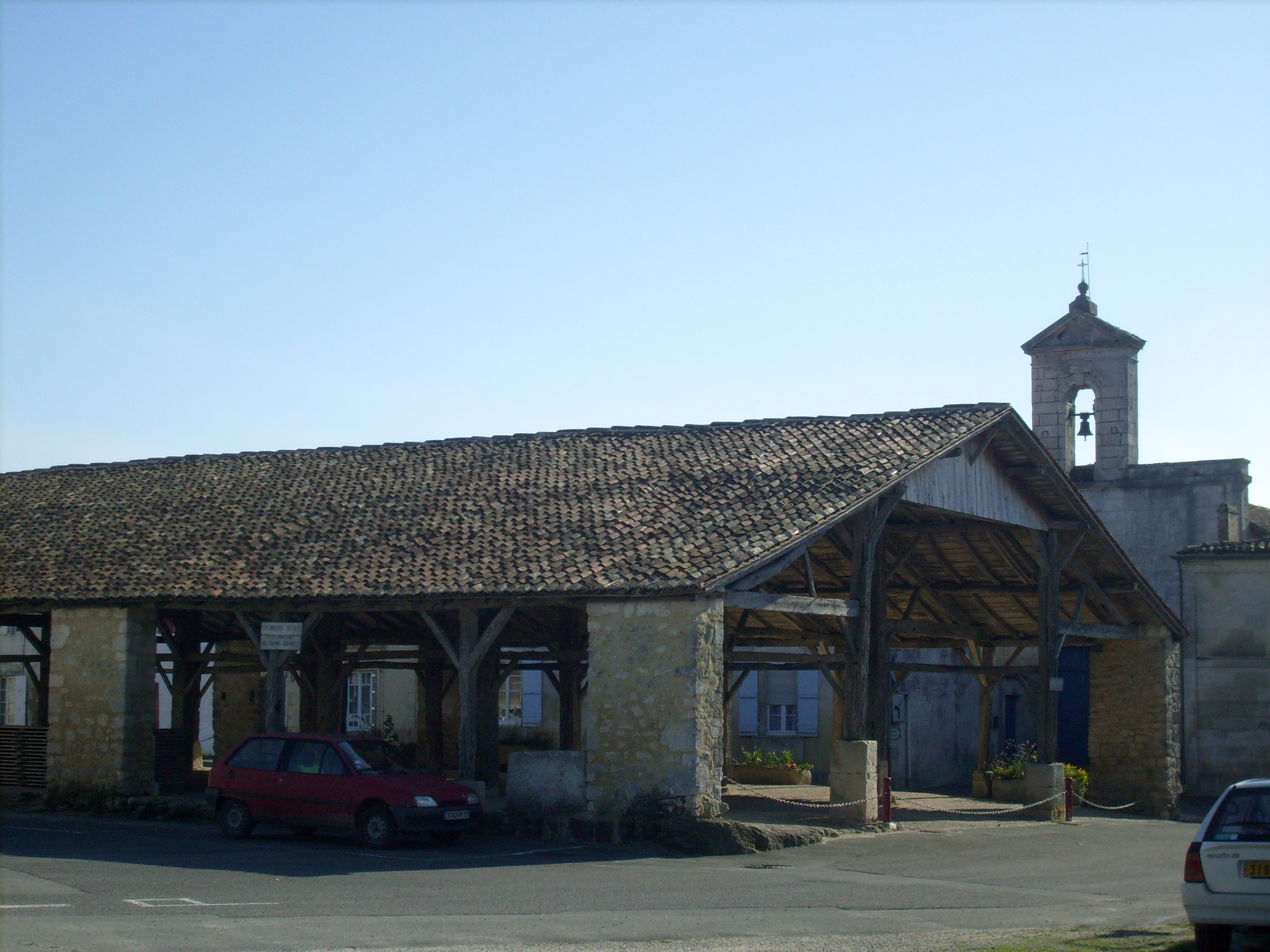
- Place Jean de Vivonne
- Location of Pisany
- Location within France Location within Nouvelle-Aquitaine
- Coordinates: 45°42′09″N 0°46′48″W
- Country: France
- Region: Nouvelle-Aquitaine
- Department: Charente-Maritime
- Arrondissement: Saintes
- Canton: Thénac
- Intercommunality: CA Saintes

Government
  - Mayor (2020–2026): Pierre Tual
- Area^{1}: 6.59 km^{2} (2.54 sq mi)
- Highest elevation: 44 m (144 ft)
- Lowest elevation: 23 m (75 ft)
- Population (2023): 759
  - Density: 115/km^{2} (298/sq mi)
- Time zone: UTC+01:00 (CET)
  - Summer (DST): UTC+02:00 (CEST)
- INSEE/Postal code: 17278 /17600
- ^{1} French Land Register data, which excludes lakes, ponds, glaciers > 1 km^{2} (0.386 sq mi or 247 acres) and river estuaries.

Pisany (French pronunciation: [pizani]) is a commune in the Charente-Maritime department in southwestern France.

== Covered market ==
It was King Philip Augustus (1165–1223) who first ordered the building of covered markets in France, allocating a specific position for market stalls and bringing them all together under one roof. The covered market (halle) in Pisany was constructed towards the end of the 16th or beginning of the 17th century, on the orders of Lord Jean de Vivonne (1530–1599), Marquis of Pisany.

The covered market consists of three rows of seven bays, separated by wooden pillars which support superb rafters, some of which were probably recovered from other buildings. Originally, the covered market was rectangular. The eastern wall was cut in 1842 to widen the passageway between the market and the adjacent houses. The covered market was listed on the Supplementary Inventory of Historic Monuments (Inventaire Supplémentaire des Monuments Historiques) in 1971.

In 1858, Pisany had up to eight fairs every year. The fairs died out during the 1960s–1970s as transport was modernised; dealers began buying cattle direct from farms and oxen were replaced by tractors. Since 1991, an annual fair has been held on Ascension Thursday, specialising in regional products. There is also a weekly market.

A shoeing stall (travail) from the last working smithy in Pisany has been placed in the covered market for preservation. A shoeing stall was used to restrain oxen and horses while the blacksmith fitted their shoes.

Other timber-built covered markets can be seen in Cozes, Rioux, Saint-Jean-d'Angle and Mornac-sur-Seudre.

== Population ==
Historical population
Year	Pop.	±% p.a.
1968	401	—
1975	397	−0.14%
1982	395	−0.07%
1990	386	−0.29%
1999	416	+0.84%
2007	449	+0.96%
2012	625	+6.84%
2017	738	+3.38%
2023	759	+0.47%
Source: INSEE

== See also ==
- Communes of the Charente-Maritime department
