= Thézac, Charente-Maritime =

Thézac
- Commune
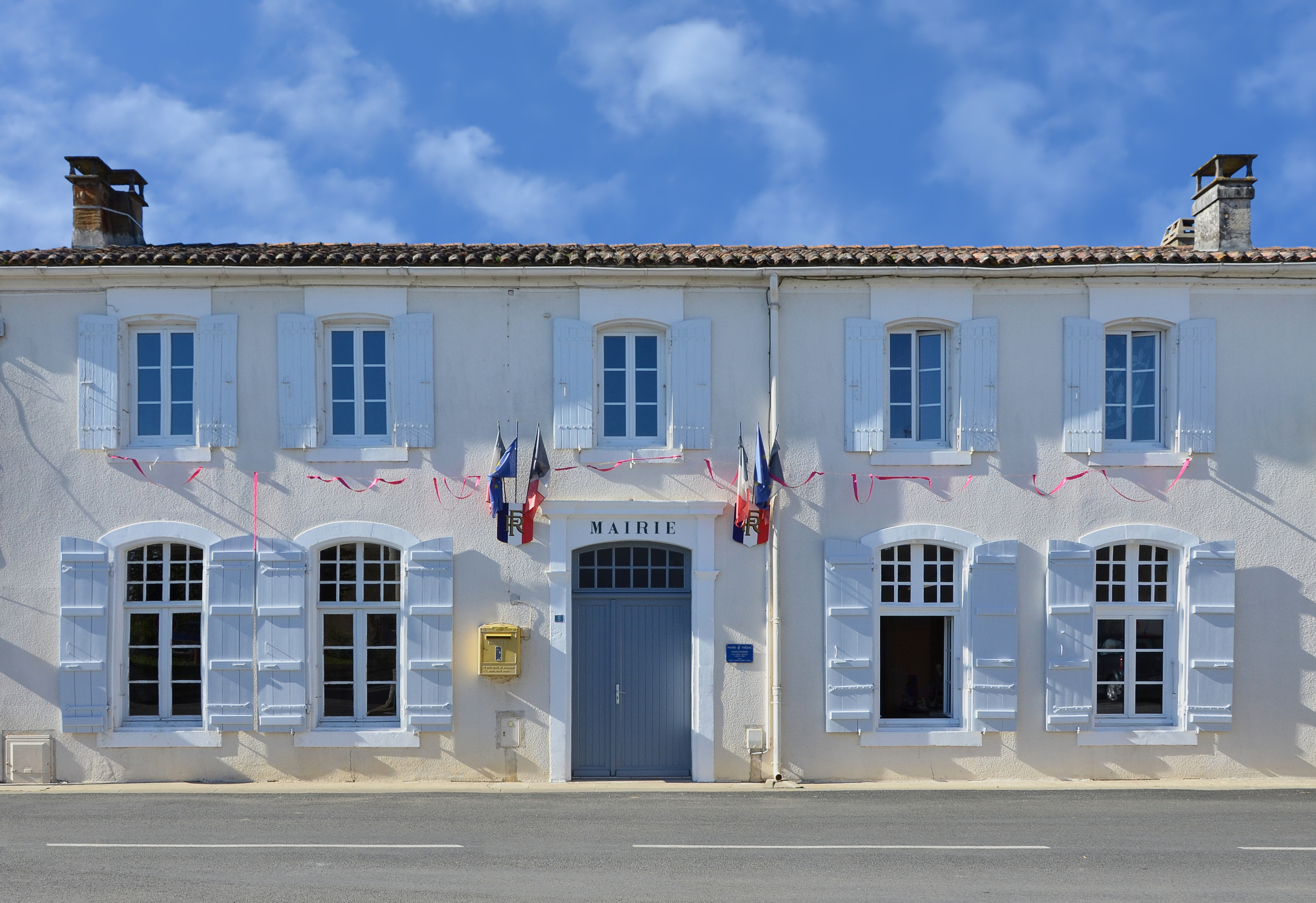
- The town hall in Thézac
- Location of Thézac
- Location within France Location within Nouvelle-Aquitaine
- Coordinates: 45°40′22″N 0°47′20″W
- Country: France
- Region: Nouvelle-Aquitaine
- Department: Charente-Maritime
- Arrondissement: Saintes
- Canton: Thénac

Government
  - Mayor (2020–2026): Louisette Rolland
- Area^{1}: 12.42 km^{2} (4.80 sq mi)
- Highest elevation: 49 m (161 ft)
- Lowest elevation: 22 m (72 ft)
- Population (2023): 331
  - Density: 26.7/km^{2} (69.0/sq mi)
- Time zone: UTC+01:00 (CET)
  - Summer (DST): UTC+02:00 (CEST)
- INSEE/Postal code: 17445 /17600
- ^{1} French Land Register data, which excludes lakes, ponds, glaciers > 1 km^{2} (0.386 sq mi or 247 acres) and river estuaries.

Thézac (French pronunciation: [tezak]) is a commune in the Charente-Maritime department in southwestern France.

== Population ==
Historical population
Year	Pop.	±% p.a.
1968	350	—
1975	321	−1.23%
1982	295	−1.20%
1990	302	+0.29%
1999	304	+0.07%
2007	327	+0.92%
2012	321	−0.37%
2017	321	+0.00%
2023	331	+0.51%
Source: INSEE

== See also ==
- Communes of the Charente-Maritime department
