= Thénac, Charente-Maritime =

Thénac
- Commune
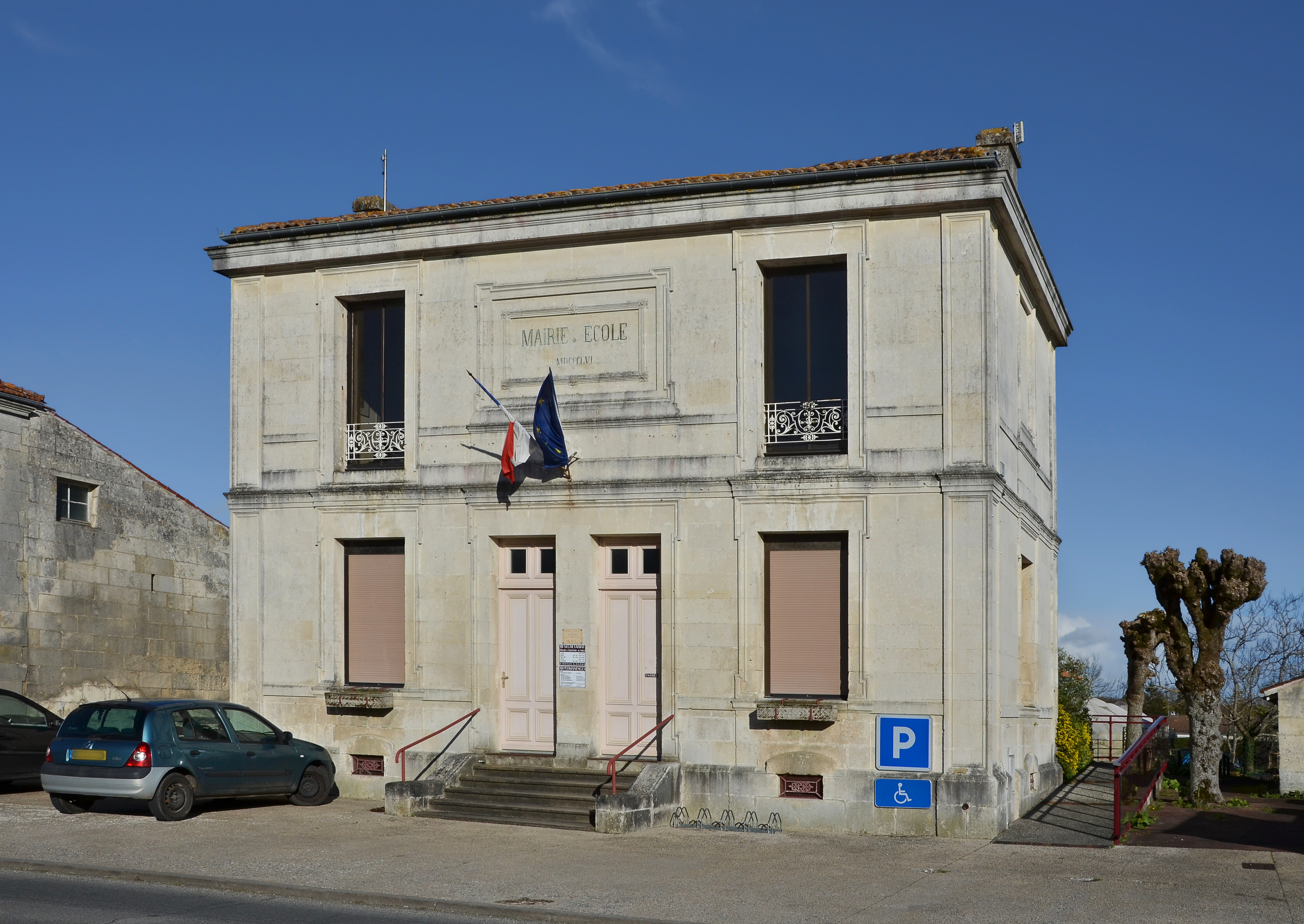
- The town hall in Thénac

- Coat of arms
- Location of Thénac
- Location within France Location within Nouvelle-Aquitaine
- Coordinates: 45°40′07″N 0°39′10″W
- Country: France
- Region: Nouvelle-Aquitaine
- Department: Charente-Maritime
- Arrondissement: Saintes
- Canton: Thénac
- Intercommunality: CA Saintes

Government
  - Mayor (2021–2026): Sylvie Mercier
- Area^{1}: 19.17 km^{2} (7.40 sq mi)
- Elevation: 54 m (177 ft)
- Highest elevation: 67 m (220 ft)
- Lowest elevation: 7 m (23 ft)
- Population (2023): 1,748
  - Density: 91.18/km^{2} (236.2/sq mi)
- Time zone: UTC+01:00 (CET)
  - Summer (DST): UTC+02:00 (CEST)
- INSEE/Postal code: 17444 /17460
- ^{1} French Land Register data, which excludes lakes, ponds, glaciers > 1 km^{2} (0.386 sq mi or 247 acres) and river estuaries.

Thénac (French pronunciation: [tenak]) is a commune in the Charente-Maritime department in southwestern France.

== Population ==
Historical population
Year	Pop.	±% p.a.
1968	705	—
1975	710	+0.10%
1982	807	+1.85%
1990	922	+1.68%
1999	1,082	+1.79%
2007	1,531	+4.43%
2012	1,618	+1.11%
2017	1,677	+0.72%
2023	1,748	+0.69%
Source: INSEE

== See also ==
- Communes of the Charente-Maritime department
