= Saint-Sever-de-Saintonge =

- Commune
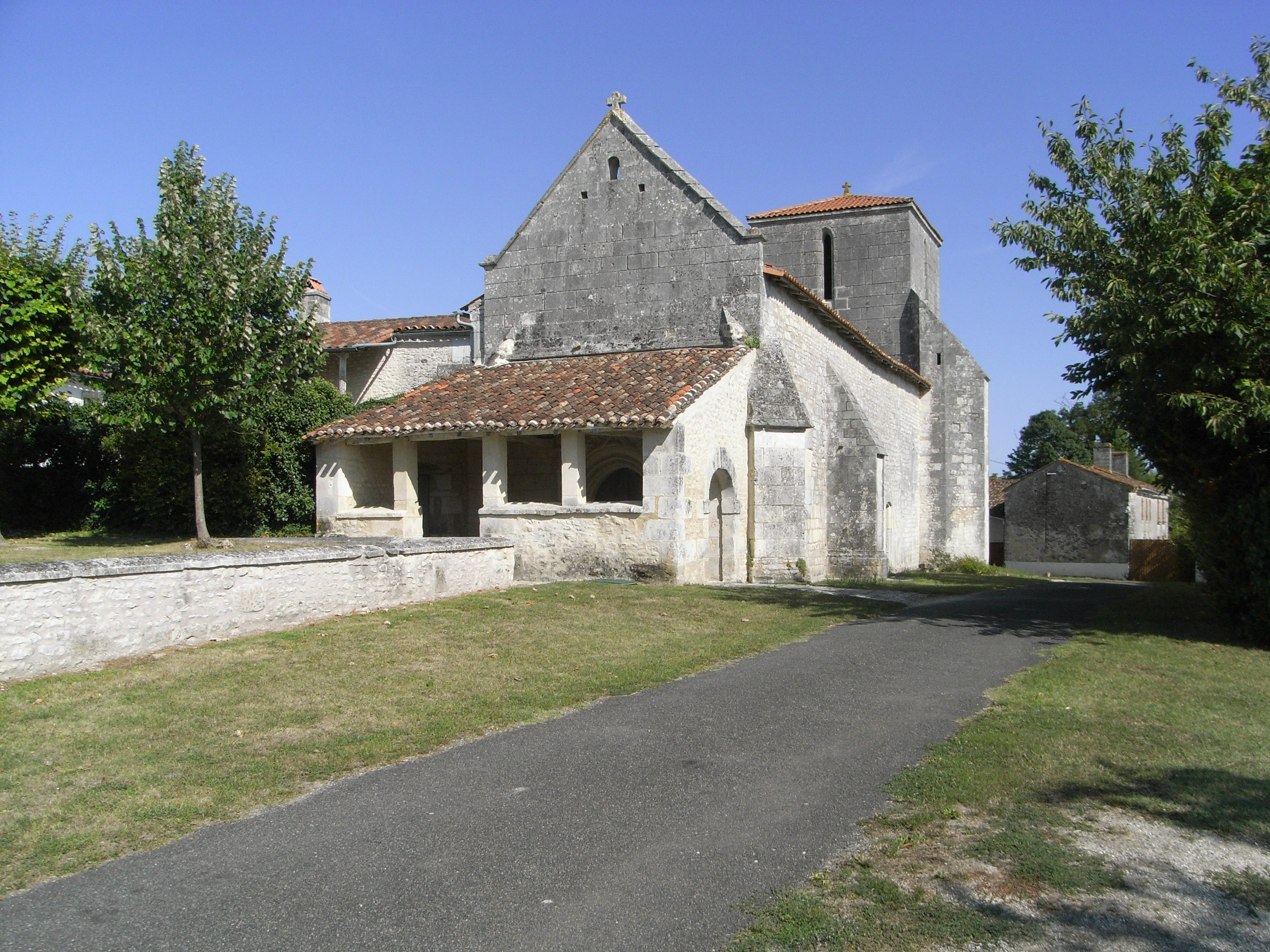
- The church in Saint-Sever-de-Saintonge
- Location of Saint-Sever-de-Saintonge
- Location within France Location within Nouvelle-Aquitaine
- Coordinates: 45°41′41″N 0°30′25″W
- Country: France
- Region: Nouvelle-Aquitaine
- Department: Charente-Maritime
- Arrondissement: Saintes
- Canton: Thénac
- Intercommunality: CA Saintes

Government
  - Mayor (2020–2026): Pierre Hervé
- Area^{1}: 8.13 km^{2} (3.14 sq mi)
- Elevation: 9 m (30 ft)
- Highest elevation: 51 m (167 ft)
- Lowest elevation: 2 m (6.6 ft)
- Population (2023): 647
  - Density: 79.6/km^{2} (206/sq mi)
- Time zone: UTC+01:00 (CET)
  - Summer (DST): UTC+02:00 (CEST)
- INSEE/Postal code: 17400 /17800
- ^{1} French Land Register data, which excludes lakes, ponds, glaciers > 1 km^{2} (0.386 sq mi or 247 acres) and river estuaries.

Saint-Sever-de-Saintonge is a commune in the Charente-Maritime department in southwestern France.

== Population ==
Historical population
Year	Pop.	±% p.a.
1968	484	—
1975	462	−0.66%
1982	431	−0.99%
1990	511	+2.15%
1999	588	+1.57%
2007	606	+0.38%
2012	617	+0.36%
2017	614	−0.10%
2023	647	+0.88%
Source: INSEE

== See also ==
- Communes of the Charente-Maritime department
