= Canton of Burie =

Coordinates: 45°46′N 0°29′W

Burie
- Former canton
- Interactive map of Burie
- Country: France
- Region: Nouvelle-Aquitaine
- Department: Charente-Maritime
- No. of communes: {{{nbcomm}}}
- Disbanded: 2015
- Area: 123.56 km^{2} (47.71 sq mi)
- Population (2012): 7,201
  - Density: 58.28/km^{2} (150.9/sq mi)

The Canton of Burie is a French former administrative division in the Département Charente-Maritime and the region Poitou-Charentes. It was disbanded following the French canton reorganisation which came into effect in March 2015. It consisted of 10 communes, which joined the canton of Chaniers in 2015. It had 7,201 inhabitants (2012).

== Communes of Burie ==
The canton comprised the following communes:

- Burie
- Chérac
- Dompierre-sur-Charente
- Écoyeux
- Migron
- Saint-Bris-des-Bois
- Saint-Césaire
- Saint-Sauvant
- Le Seure
- Villars-les-Bois

== See also ==
- Cantons of the Charente-Maritime department
