= Annepont =

- Commune
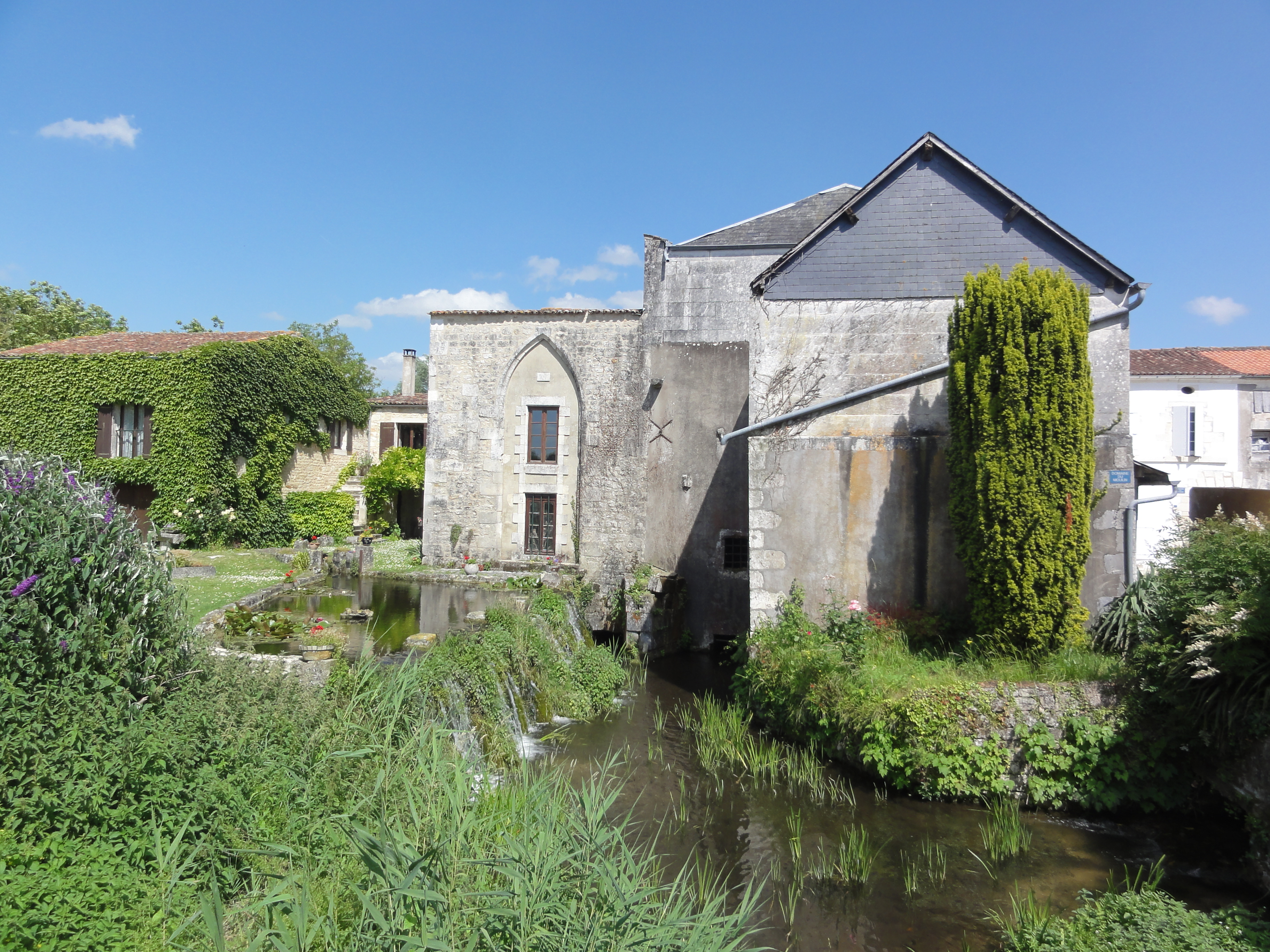
- Watermill

- Coat of arms
- Location of Annepont
- Location within France Location within Nouvelle-Aquitaine
- Coordinates: 45°50′38″N 0°36′49″W
- Country: France
- Region: Nouvelle-Aquitaine
- Department: Charente-Maritime
- Arrondissement: Saint-Jean-d'Angély
- Canton: Saint-Jean-d'Angély
- Intercommunality: Vals de Saintonge Communauté

Government
  - Mayor (2020–2026): Francis Boizumault
- Area^{1}: 8.81 km^{2} (3.40 sq mi)
- Elevation: 14 m (46 ft)
- Highest elevation: 62 m (203 ft)
- Lowest elevation: 3 m (9.8 ft)
- Population (2023): 399
  - Density: 45.3/km^{2} (117/sq mi)
- Time zone: UTC+01:00 (CET)
  - Summer (DST): UTC+02:00 (CEST)
- INSEE/Postal code: 17011 /17350
- ^{1} French Land Register data, which excludes lakes, ponds, glaciers > 1 km^{2} (0.386 sq mi or 247 acres) and river estuaries.

Annepont (French pronunciation: [anpɔ̃]) is a commune in the Charente-Maritime department in the Nouvelle-Aquitaine region of southwestern France.

== Geography ==
Annepont is located some 15 km south-west of Saint-Jean-d'Angely and 13 km north of Saintes. The A10 autoroute (E5) passes through the west of the commune but has no exit in or near the commune. Access to the commune is by the D127 from Taillebourg to the south-west passing through the village and continuing north to Mazeray. The D230 road also goes east from the village to Juico. The D231 also passes through the south of the commune forming part of the southern border and continues to Écoyeux to the south-east. The commune has extensive forests in the east covering some 40% of the land area with the rest of the commune farmland.

The Ruisseau de la Blanchardiere rises in the east of the commune and flows west joining with numerous other streams.

== Toponymy ==
Toponymists do not mention an old form for this place name so that the etymology of Annepont remains hypothetical. Albert Dauzat saw a compound of the elements Anna, a Germanic personal name, followed by the Gallo-Roman Ponte (from the Latin pons) meaning "bridge".

Ernest Nègre agreed on the nature of the second element -pont but interpreted the first in a radically different way: it is possibly the local term asne meaning "humpbacked" - i.e. "humpbacked bridge".

N.B.: There is a Germanic personal name Anna which is unrelated to the Hebrew personal name Hanna(h) (giving Anna then Anne). This anthroponym is an hypocoristic Germanic anthroponym beginning with the element Arn-. The final a rather indicates a Saxon origin. This hypothesis is supported by the existence of a number of place names in the region (notably in -ville) so the first element could be a Saxon anthroponym. In addition, archaeological excavations confirm the presence of Saxons in the region. This far south a compound structure is expected rather than the Romanesque *Pontanne but Annepont is more reminiscent of a toponymic type of northern France marked by Germanic influence and made from a Germanic anthroponym as for Radepont, Senarpont, Hubertpont, Carlepont, etc. The solution advocated by Ernest Nègre, if possible phonetically, is even more hypothetical inasmuch as an ancient form of the type *Asnepont is required.

== Administration ==
List of Successive Mayors

From	To	Name	Party
2001	2026	Francis Boizumault	DVD

== Population ==
The inhabitants of the commune are known as Annepontois or Annepontoises in French.

Historical population
Year	Pop.	±% p.a.
1968	184	—
1975	177	−0.55%
1982	220	+3.16%
1990	208	−0.70%
1999	267	+2.81%
2007	292	+1.13%
2012	357	+4.10%
2017	377	+1.10%
2023	399	+0.95%
Source: INSEE

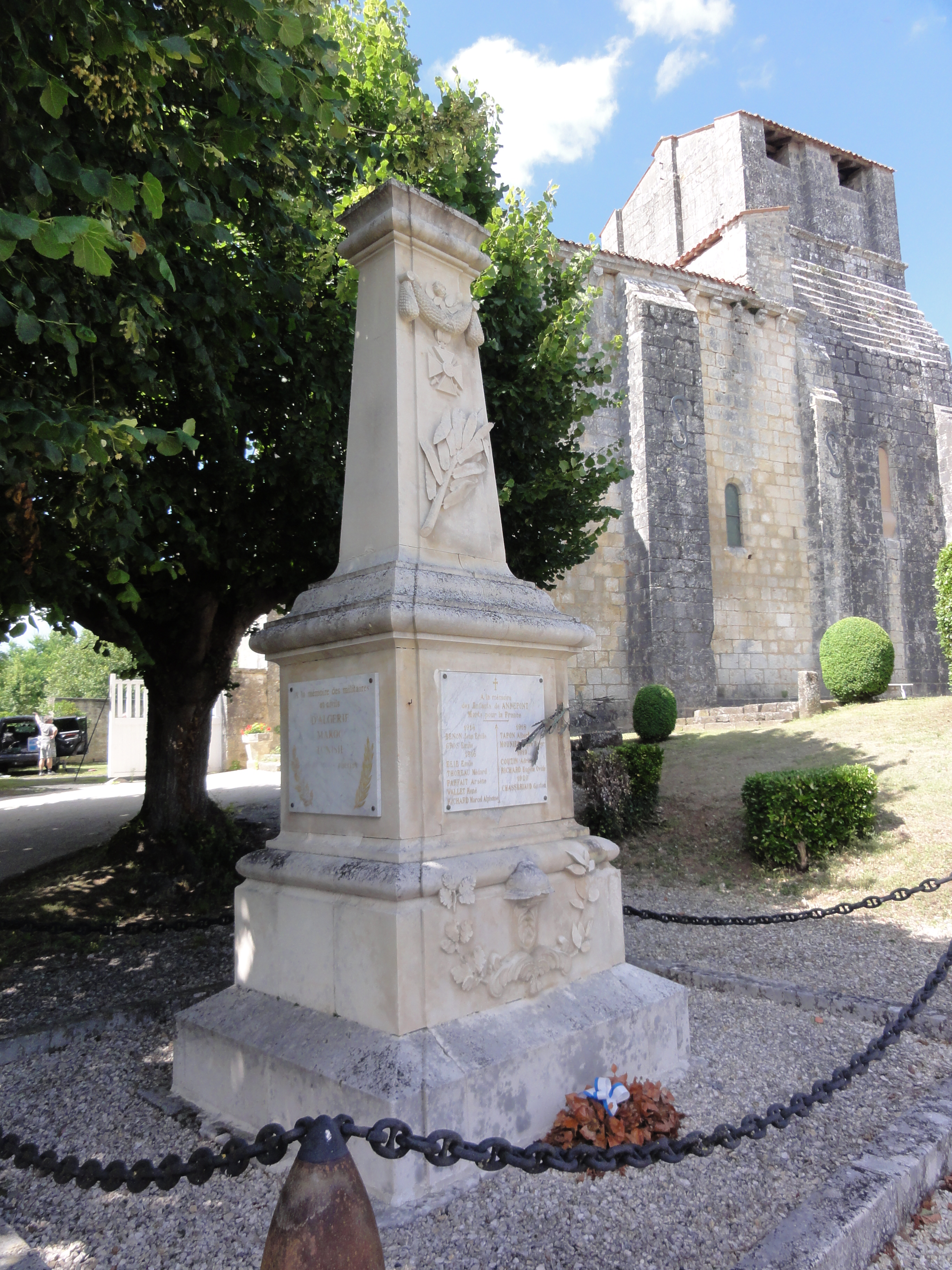
The War Memorial

== Culture and heritage ==
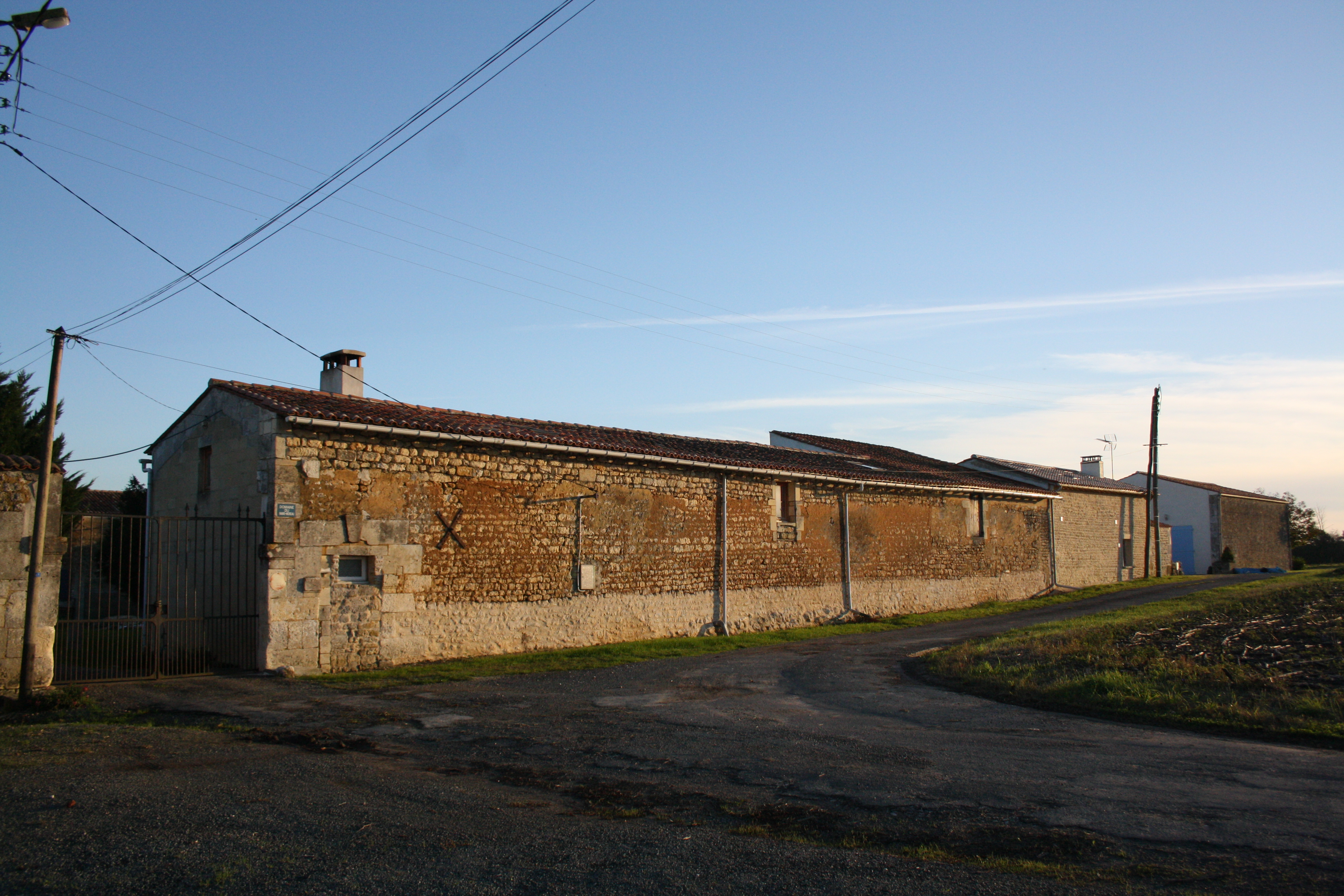
Logis of Maine-Moreau.

=== Civil heritage ===
- The Logis of Maine-Moreau (17th century), located in the Annepont countryside, is registered as an historical monument.

=== Religious heritage ===
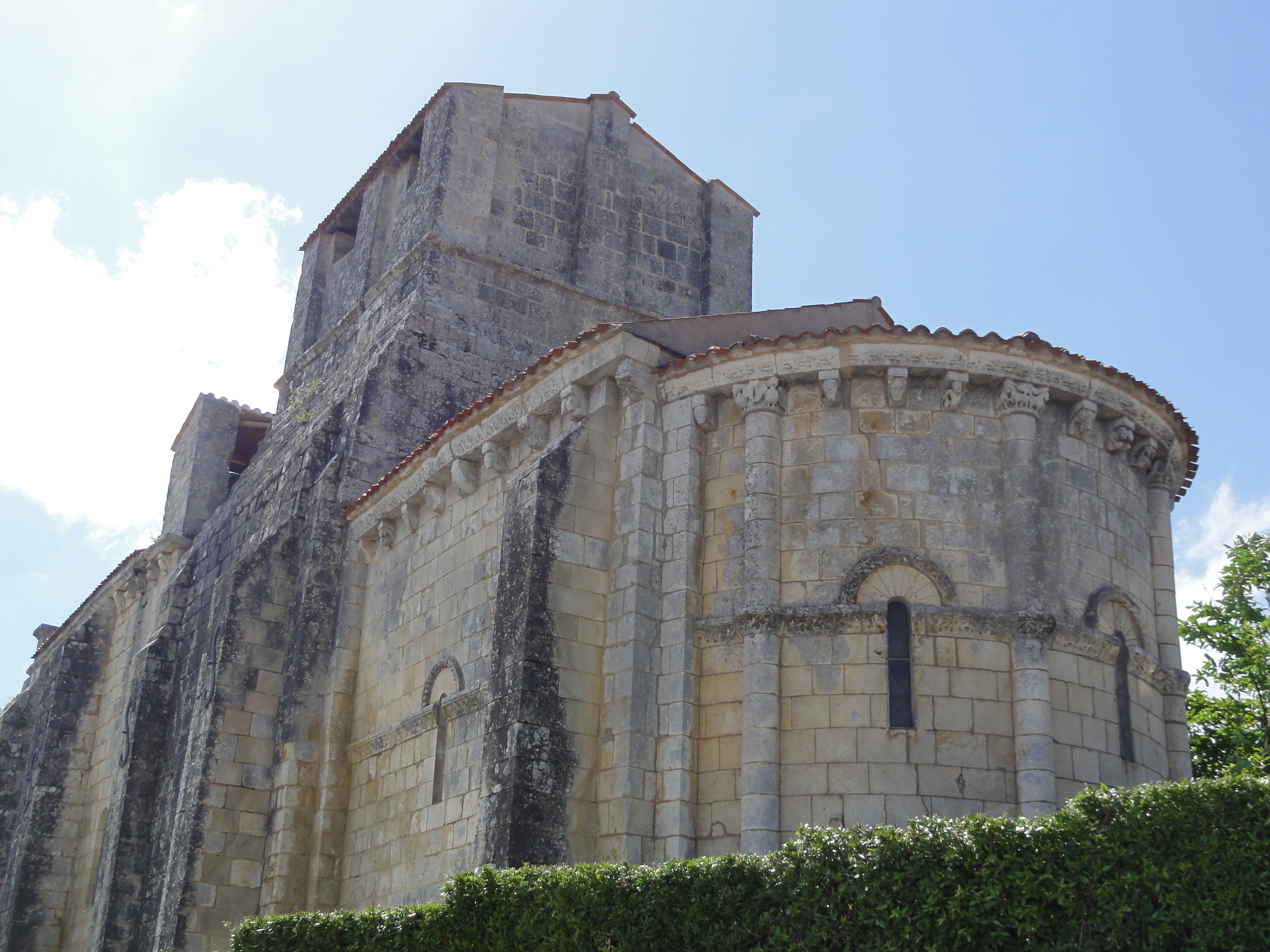
Church of Saint-André at Annepont.

- The Church of Saint-André (12th century) is registered as an historical monument. The Romanesque church is located on a promontory and distinguished by a gate without a tympanum surrounded by Corinthian capitals and its ornamented chevet beautifully executed. Old houses surrounding the building give a special character to the whole.

== Transport ==
=== Railway stations and halts ===
- Taillebourg (Halt) 2.7 km
- Saint-Savinien (Halt) 6 km
- Saint-Hilaire-de-Villefranche, Brizambourg (Halt) 6.3 km
- Saintes 10.6 km
- Saint-Jean-d'Angely 13.6 km

=== Airport and aerodrome ===
- Rochefort-St-Agnant 28.9 km
- Cognac 31 km
- Royan-Medis Aerodrome 36.6 km

== See also ==
- Communes of the Charente-Maritime department
