= Fontcouverte =

Fontcouverte may refer to the following places in France:

- Fontcouverte, Aude, a commune in Aude
- Fontcouverte, Charente-Maritime, a commune in Charente-Maritime
- Fontcouverte-la-Toussuire, a commune in Savoie
