= Aujac =

Aujac may refer to:

- Aujac, Charente-Maritime, a French commune
- Aujac, Gard, a French commune
- Aujac: Association of Java Users of Catalonia
