= Migron =

Migron may refer to:

- Migron, Charente-Maritime, a commune in France
- Migron, Mateh Binyamin, an Israeli outpost
