= Le Douhet =

- Commune
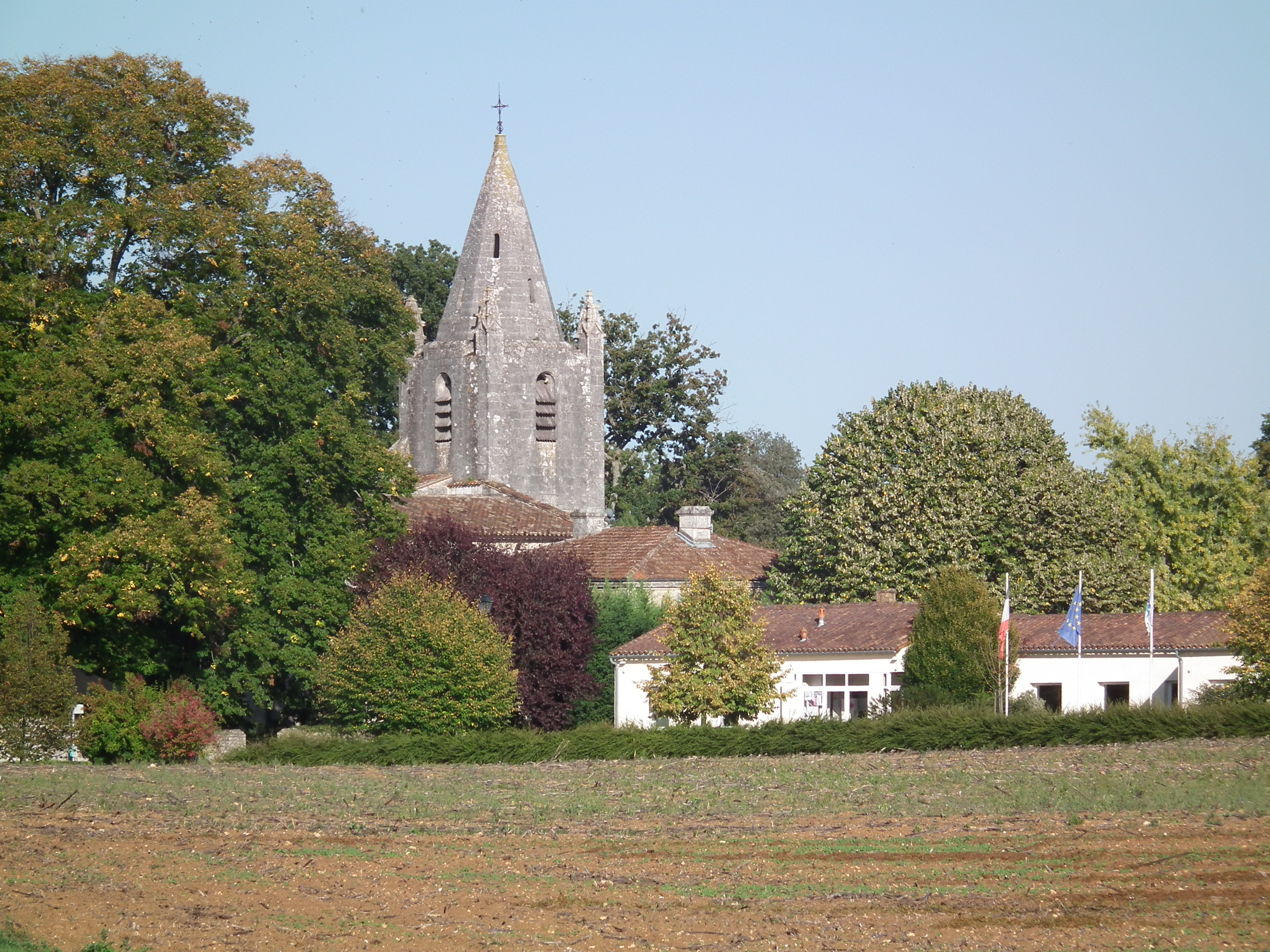
- A general view of Le Douhet
- Location of Le Douhet
- Location within France Location within Nouvelle-Aquitaine
- Coordinates: 45°49′13″N 0°34′11″W
- Country: France
- Region: Nouvelle-Aquitaine
- Department: Charente-Maritime
- Arrondissement: Saintes
- Canton: Chaniers
- Intercommunality: CA Saintes

Government
  - Mayor (2020–2026): Stéphane Taillasson
- Area^{1}: 18.35 km^{2} (7.08 sq mi)
- Elevation: 64 m (210 ft)
- Highest elevation: 81 m (266 ft)
- Lowest elevation: 12 m (39 ft)
- Population (2023): 708
  - Density: 38.6/km^{2} (99.9/sq mi)
- Time zone: UTC+01:00 (CET)
  - Summer (DST): UTC+02:00 (CEST)
- INSEE/Postal code: 17143 /17100
- ^{1} French Land Register data, which excludes lakes, ponds, glaciers > 1 km^{2} (0.386 sq mi or 247 acres) and river estuaries.

Le Douhet (French pronunciation: [lə du.ɛ]) is a commune in the Charente-Maritime department in southwestern France.

== Population ==
Historical population
Year	Pop.	±% p.a.
1968	502	—
1975	477	−0.73%
1982	518	+1.18%
1990	589	+1.62%
1999	636	+0.86%
2007	700	+1.21%
2012	694	−0.17%
2017	713	+0.54%
2023	708	−0.12%
Source: INSEE

== See also ==
- Communes of the Charente-Maritime department
