= Nantillé =

- Commune
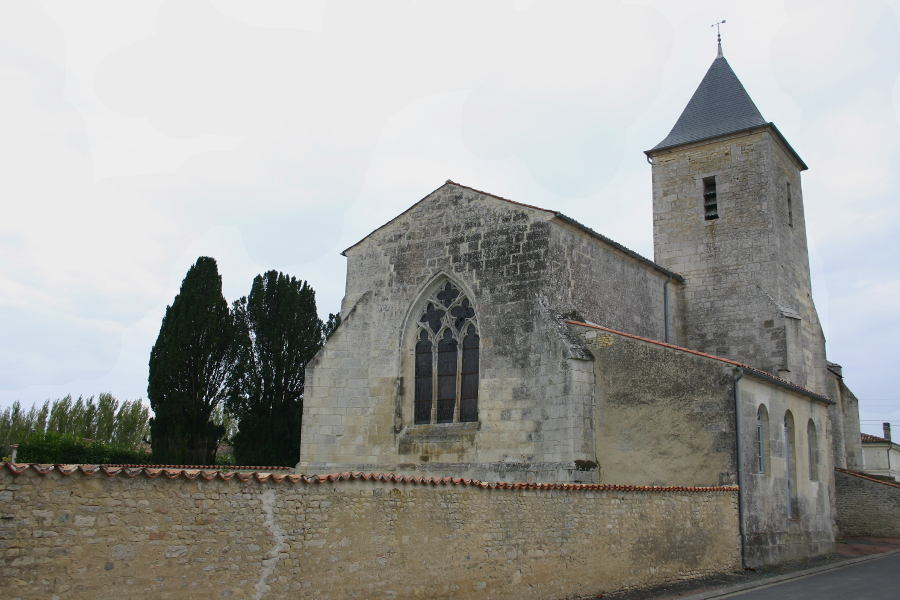
- The church in Nantillé
- Location of Nantillé
- Location within France Location within Nouvelle-Aquitaine
- Coordinates: 45°51′17″N 0°27′59″W
- Country: France
- Region: Nouvelle-Aquitaine
- Department: Charente-Maritime
- Arrondissement: Saint-Jean-d'Angély
- Canton: Chaniers

Government
  - Mayor (2020–2026): Frédéric Micheau
- Area^{1}: 10.78 km^{2} (4.16 sq mi)
- Elevation: 55 m (180 ft)
- Highest elevation: 74 m (243 ft)
- Lowest elevation: 31 m (102 ft)
- Population (2023): 325
  - Density: 30.1/km^{2} (78.1/sq mi)
- Time zone: UTC+01:00 (CET)
  - Summer (DST): UTC+02:00 (CEST)
- INSEE/Postal code: 17256 /17770
- ^{1} French Land Register data, which excludes lakes, ponds, glaciers > 1 km^{2} (0.386 sq mi or 247 acres) and river estuaries.

Nantillé (French pronunciation: [nɑ̃tije]) is a commune in the Charente-Maritime department in southwestern France.

== Population ==
Historical population
Year	Pop.	±% p.a.
1968	270	—
1975	244	−1.44%
1982	261	+0.97%
1990	259	−0.10%
1999	278	+0.79%
2007	323	+1.89%
2012	332	+0.55%
2017	326	−0.36%
2023	325	−0.05%
Source: INSEE

== See also ==
- Communes of the Charente-Maritime department
