= Bercloux =

- Commune
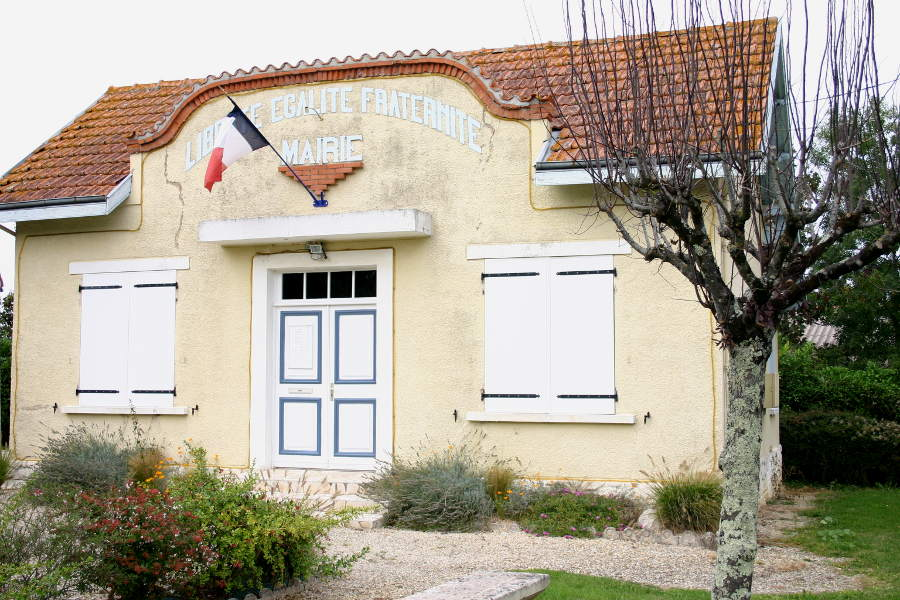
- The town hall in Bercloux
- Location of Bercloux
- Location within France Location within Nouvelle-Aquitaine
- Coordinates: 45°50′10″N 0°28′12″W
- Country: France
- Region: Nouvelle-Aquitaine
- Department: Charente-Maritime
- Arrondissement: Saint-Jean-d'Angély
- Canton: Chaniers

Government
  - Mayor (2020–2026): Philippe Laclie
- Area^{1}: 9.35 km^{2} (3.61 sq mi)
- Elevation: 40 m (130 ft)
- Highest elevation: 61 m (200 ft)
- Lowest elevation: 25 m (82 ft)
- Population (2023): 448
  - Density: 47.9/km^{2} (124/sq mi)
- Time zone: UTC+01:00 (CET)
  - Summer (DST): UTC+02:00 (CEST)
- INSEE/Postal code: 17042 /17770
- ^{1} French Land Register data, which excludes lakes, ponds, glaciers > 1 km^{2} (0.386 sq mi or 247 acres) and river estuaries.

Bercloux (French pronunciation: [bɛʁklu]) is a commune in the Charente-Maritime department in southwestern France.

== Population ==
Historical population
Year	Pop.	±% p.a.
1968	381	—
1975	365	−0.61%
1982	332	−1.34%
1990	312	−0.77%
1999	325	+0.45%
2007	358	+1.22%
2012	457	+5.00%
2017	439	−0.80%
2023	448	+0.34%
Source: INSEE

== See also ==
- Communes of the Charente-Maritime department
