= Aumagne =

- Commune
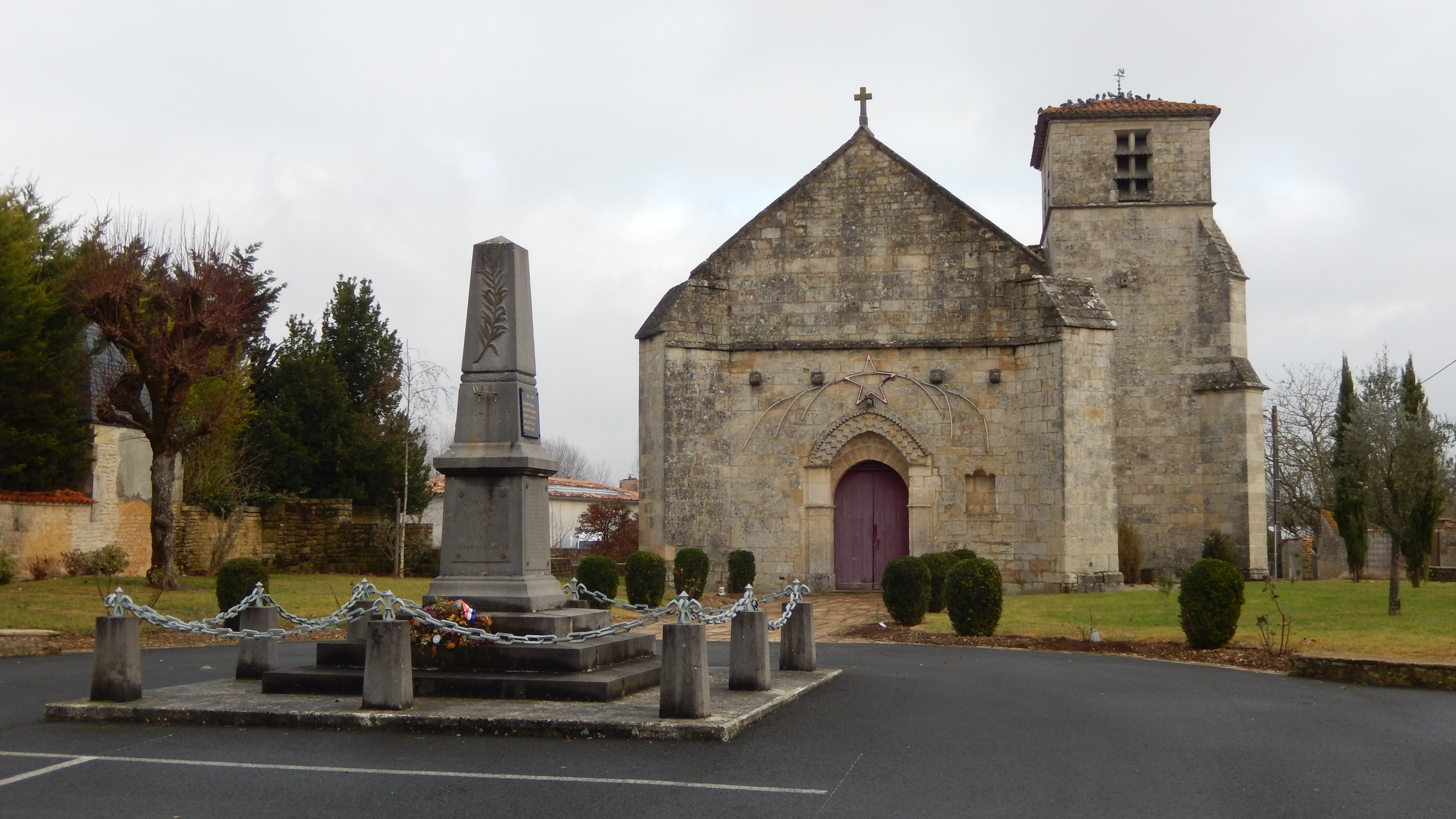
- War memorial and Saint-Peter church.
- Location of Aumagne
- Location within France Location within Nouvelle-Aquitaine
- Coordinates: 45°52′31″N 0°24′10″W
- Country: France
- Region: Nouvelle-Aquitaine
- Department: Charente-Maritime
- Arrondissement: Saint-Jean-d'Angély
- Canton: Chaniers
- Intercommunality: CC Vals de Saintonge

Government
  - Mayor (2020–2026): René Escloupier
- Area^{1}: 20.50 km^{2} (7.92 sq mi)
- Elevation: 36 m (118 ft)
- Highest elevation: 60 m (200 ft)
- Lowest elevation: 22 m (72 ft)
- Population (2023): 694
  - Density: 33.9/km^{2} (87.7/sq mi)
- Time zone: UTC+01:00 (CET)
  - Summer (DST): UTC+02:00 (CEST)
- INSEE/Postal code: 17025 /17770
- ^{1} French Land Register data, which excludes lakes, ponds, glaciers > 1 km^{2} (0.386 sq mi or 247 acres) and river estuaries.

Aumagne (French pronunciation: [omaɲ]) is a commune in the Charente-Maritime department in southwestern France.

== Population ==
Historical population
Year	Pop.	±% p.a.
1968	737	—
1975	636	−2.08%
1982	642	+0.13%
1990	634	−0.16%
1999	610	−0.43%
2007	659	+0.97%
2012	707	+1.42%
2017	707	+0.00%
2023	694	−0.31%
Source: INSEE

== See also ==
- Communes of the Charente-Maritime department
