= Sainte-Même =

- Commune
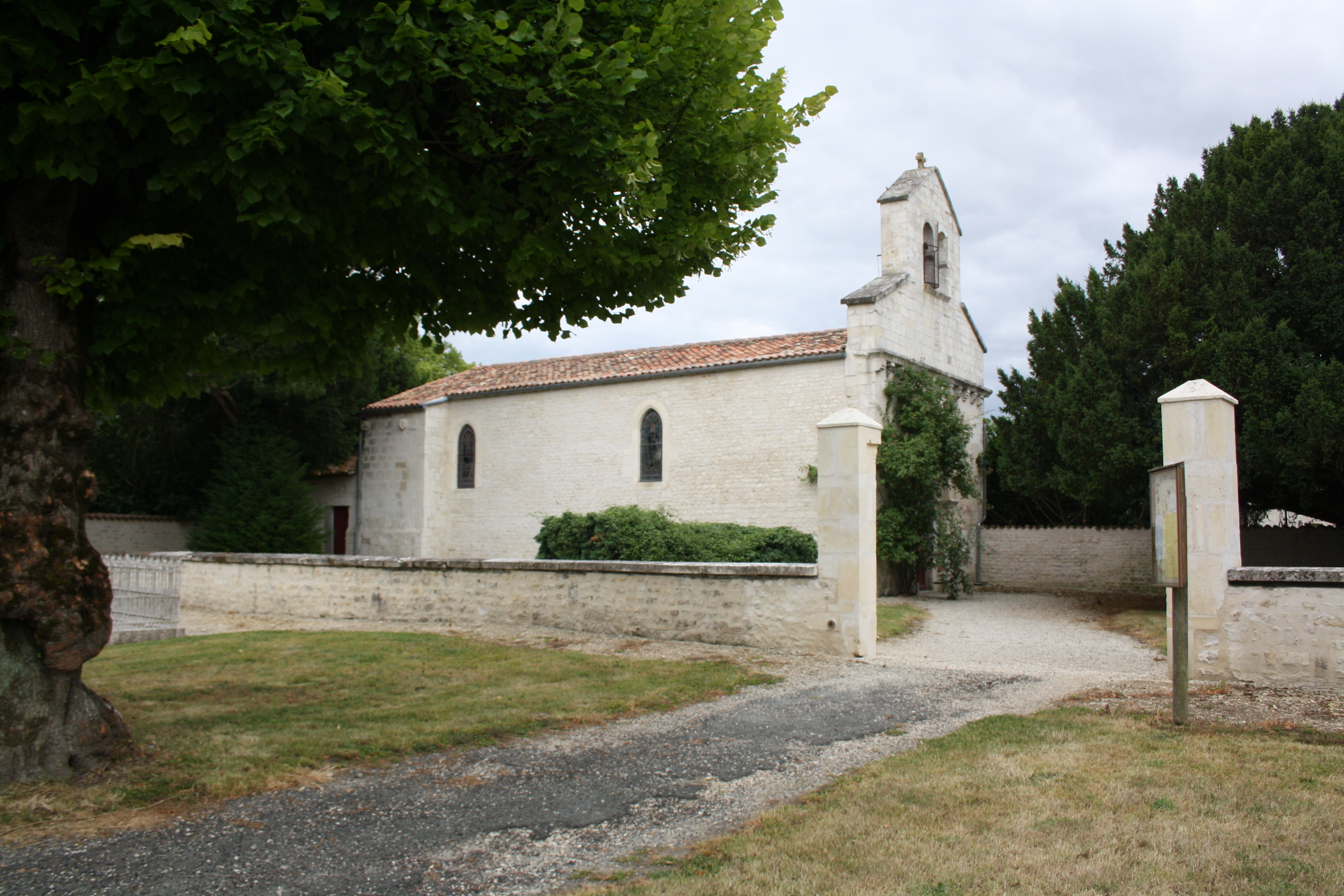
- The church in Sainte-Même
- Location of Sainte-Même
- Location within France Location within Nouvelle-Aquitaine
- Coordinates: 45°52′39″N 0°27′31″W
- Country: France
- Region: Nouvelle-Aquitaine
- Department: Charente-Maritime
- Arrondissement: Saint-Jean-d'Angély
- Canton: Chaniers

Government
  - Mayor (2020–2026): Danielle Pertus
- Area^{1}: 6.15 km^{2} (2.37 sq mi)
- Elevation: 32 m (105 ft)
- Highest elevation: 52 m (171 ft)
- Lowest elevation: 27 m (89 ft)
- Population (2023): 223
  - Density: 36.3/km^{2} (93.9/sq mi)
- Time zone: UTC+01:00 (CET)
  - Summer (DST): UTC+02:00 (CEST)
- INSEE/Postal code: 17374 /17770
- ^{1} French Land Register data, which excludes lakes, ponds, glaciers > 1 km^{2} (0.386 sq mi or 247 acres) and river estuaries.

Sainte-Même (French pronunciation: [sɛ̃t mɛm]) is a commune in the Charente-Maritime department in southwestern France.

== Population ==
Historical population
Year	Pop.	±% p.a.
1968	246	—
1975	252	+0.34%
1982	197	−3.46%
1990	183	−0.92%
1999	163	−1.28%
2007	237	+4.79%
2012	252	+1.23%
2017	244	−0.64%
2023	223	−1.49%
Source: INSEE

== See also ==
- Communes of the Charente-Maritime department
