= Bussac-sur-Charente =

- Commune
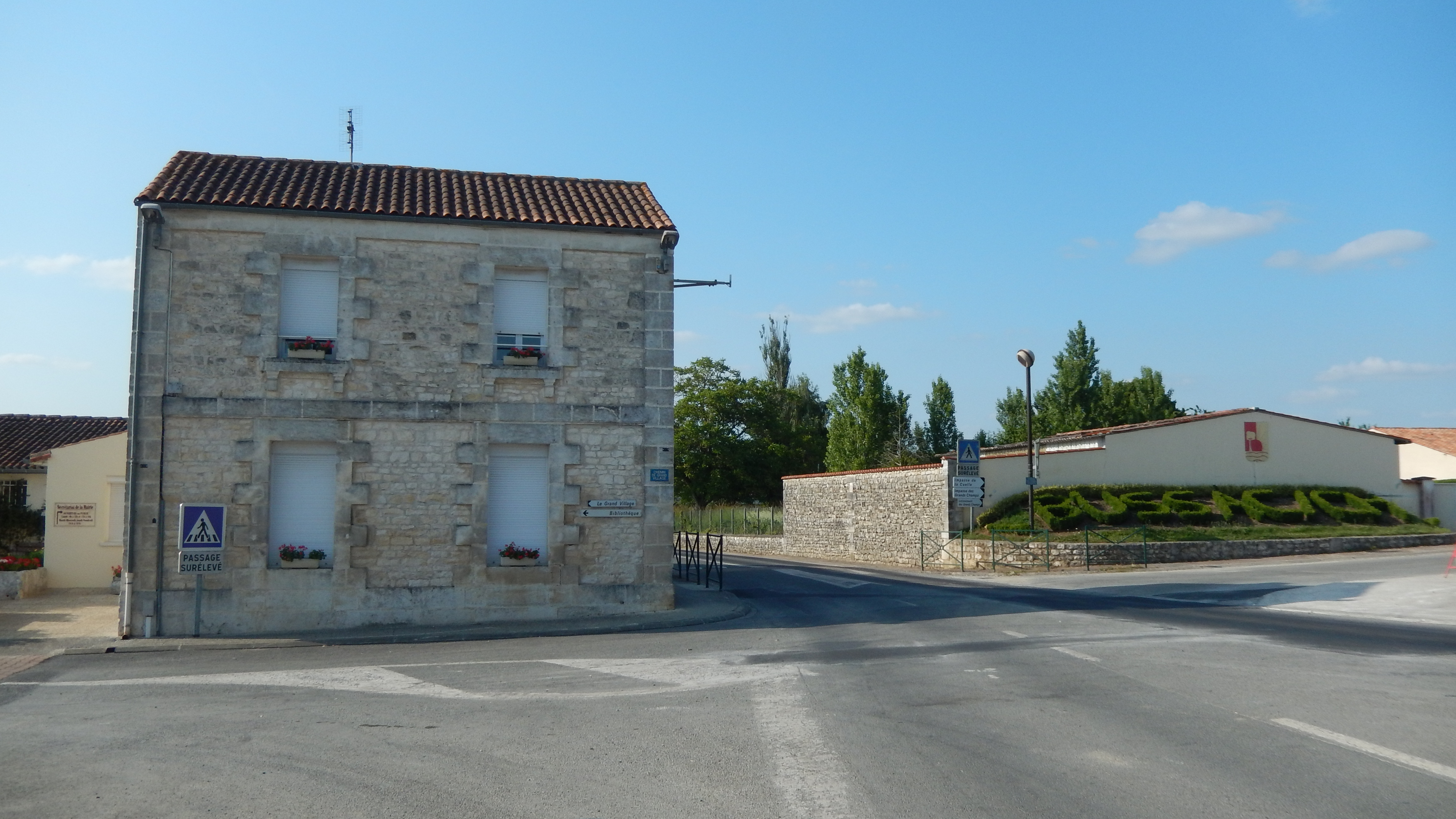
- The town hall in Bussac-sur-Charente

- Coat of arms
- Location of Bussac-sur-Charente
- Location within France Location within Nouvelle-Aquitaine
- Coordinates: 45°47′13″N 0°37′59″W
- Country: France
- Region: Nouvelle-Aquitaine
- Department: Charente-Maritime
- Arrondissement: Saintes
- Canton: Chaniers
- Intercommunality: CA Saintes

Government
  - Mayor (2020–2026): Jean-Luc Marchais
- Area^{1}: 9.98 km^{2} (3.85 sq mi)
- Elevation: 12 m (39 ft)
- Highest elevation: 60 m (200 ft)
- Lowest elevation: 2 m (6.6 ft)
- Population (2023): 1,321
  - Density: 132/km^{2} (343/sq mi)
- Time zone: UTC+01:00 (CET)
  - Summer (DST): UTC+02:00 (CEST)
- INSEE/Postal code: 17073 /17100
- ^{1} French Land Register data, which excludes lakes, ponds, glaciers > 1 km^{2} (0.386 sq mi or 247 acres) and river estuaries.

Bussac-sur-Charente (French pronunciation: [bysak syʁ ʃaʁɑ̃t], literally Bussac on Charente, before 1984: Bussac) is a commune in the Charente-Maritime department in the Nouvelle-Aquitaine region in southwestern France.

== Population ==
Historical population
Year	Pop.	±% p.a.
1968	602	—
1975	662	+1.37%
1982	860	+3.81%
1990	989	+1.76%
1999	1,123	+1.42%
2007	1,247	+1.32%
2012	1,338	+1.42%
2017	1,266	−1.10%
2023	1,321	+0.71%
Source: INSEE

== International relations ==
Bussac-sur-Charente is twinned with Oron-la-Ville, Switzerland.

== See also ==
- Communes of the Charente-Maritime department
