= Chaniers =

- Commune
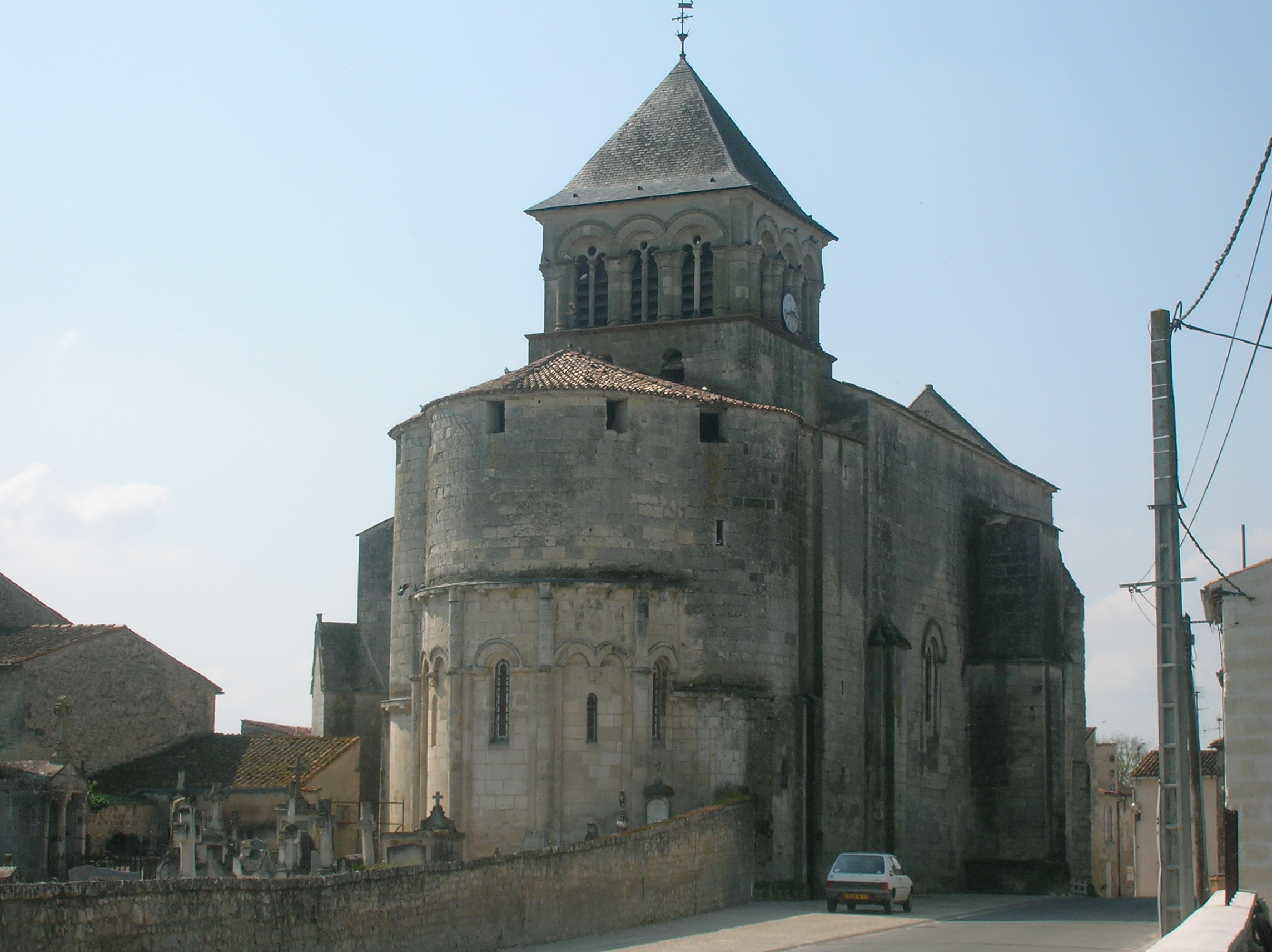
- The church in Chaniers

- Coat of arms
- Location of Chaniers
- Location within France Location within Nouvelle-Aquitaine
- Coordinates: 45°43′08″N 0°33′21″W
- Country: France
- Region: Nouvelle-Aquitaine
- Department: Charente-Maritime
- Arrondissement: Saintes
- Canton: Chaniers
- Intercommunality: CA Saintes

Government
  - Mayor (2020–2026): Éric Pannaud (DVD)
- Area^{1}: 26.53 km^{2} (10.24 sq mi)
- Highest elevation: 74 m (243 ft)
- Lowest elevation: 2 m (6.6 ft)
- Population (2023): 3,651
  - Density: 137.6/km^{2} (356.4/sq mi)
- Time zone: UTC+01:00 (CET)
  - Summer (DST): UTC+02:00 (CEST)
- INSEE/Postal code: 17086 /17610
- ^{1} French Land Register data, which excludes lakes, ponds, glaciers > 1 km^{2} (0.386 sq mi or 247 acres) and river estuaries.

Chaniers (French pronunciation: [ʃanje]) is a commune in the Charente-Maritime department in southwestern France.

== Population ==
Historical population

Year	Pop.	±% p.a.
1793	2,387	—
1800	2,122	−1.67%
1806	1,922	−1.64%
1821	2,532	+1.85%
1831	2,719	+0.72%
1836	2,733	+0.10%
1841	2,530	−1.53%
1846	2,522	−0.06%
1851	2,611	+0.70%
1856	2,556	−0.42%
1861	2,563	+0.05%
1866	2,565	+0.02%
1872	2,309	−1.74%
1876	2,233	−0.83%
1881	2,151	−0.75%
1886	2,260	+0.99%
1891	2,115	−1.32%
1896	2,029	−0.83%
1901	2,003	−0.26%

Year	Pop.	±% p.a.
1906	2,004	+0.01%
1911	1,910	−0.96%
1921	1,809	−0.54%
1926	1,732	−0.87%
1931	1,694	−0.44%
1936	1,723	+0.34%
1946	1,934	+1.16%
1954	1,955	+0.14%
1962	2,022	+0.42%
1968	2,255	+1.83%
1975	2,750	+2.88%
1982	2,960	+1.06%
1990	3,086	+0.52%
1999	3,231	+0.51%
2007	3,355	+0.47%
2012	3,502	+0.86%
2017	3,590	+0.50%
2023	3,651	+0.28%

Source: EHESS and INSEE (1968-2023)

== See also ==
- Communes of the Charente-Maritime department
