= Dompierre-sur-Charente =

- Commune
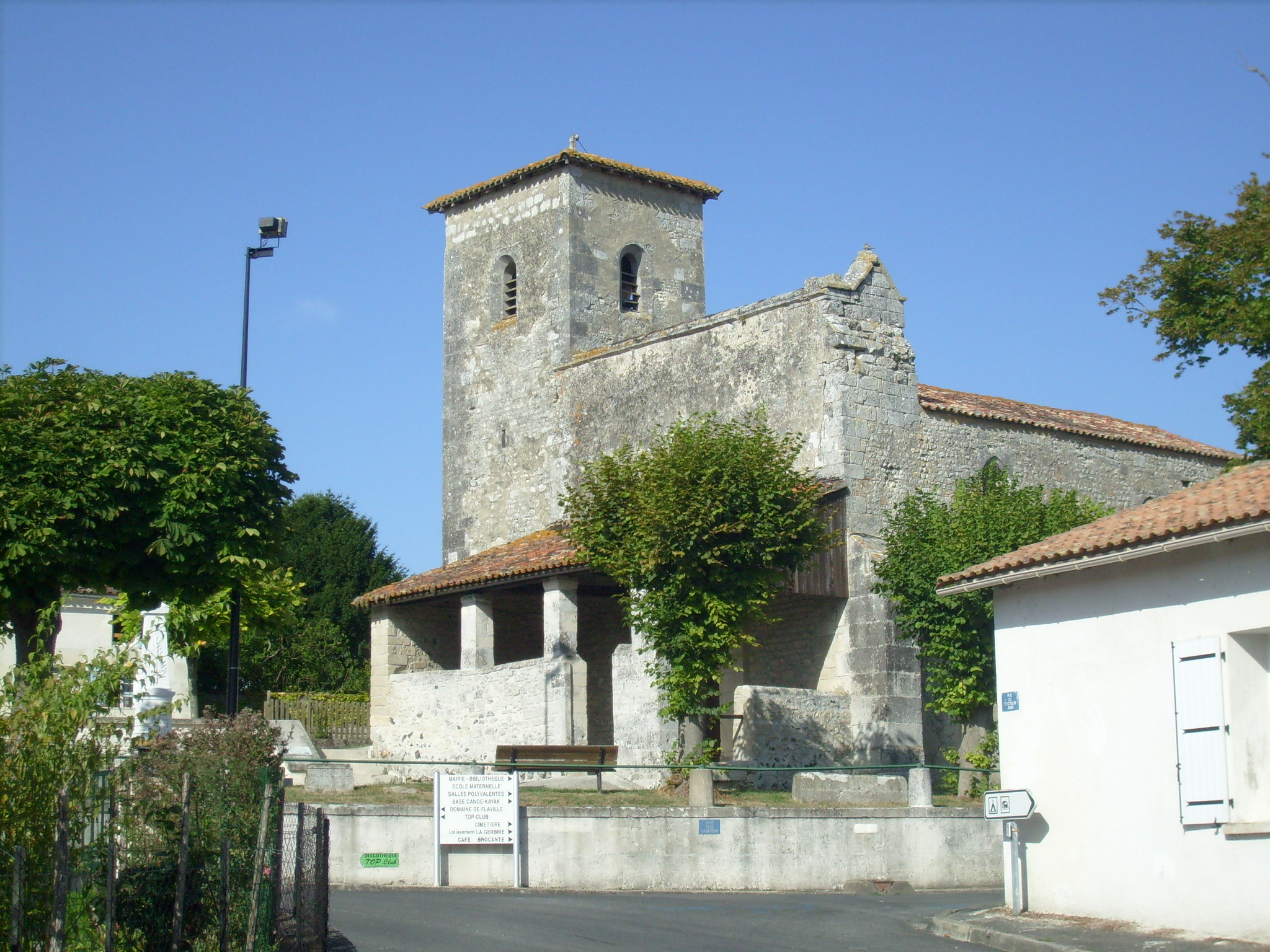
- The church in Dompierre-sur-Charente
- Location of Dompierre-sur-Charente
- Location within France Location within Nouvelle-Aquitaine
- Coordinates: 45°42′09″N 0°29′29″W
- Country: France
- Region: Nouvelle-Aquitaine
- Department: Charente-Maritime
- Arrondissement: Saintes
- Canton: Chaniers
- Intercommunality: CA Saintes

Government
  - Mayor (2020–2026): Gaby Touzinaud
- Area^{1}: 8.29 km^{2} (3.20 sq mi)
- Highest elevation: 70 m (230 ft)
- Lowest elevation: 2 m (6.6 ft)
- Population (2023): 477
  - Density: 57.5/km^{2} (149/sq mi)
- Time zone: UTC+01:00 (CET)
  - Summer (DST): UTC+02:00 (CEST)
- INSEE/Postal code: 17141 /17610
- ^{1} French Land Register data, which excludes lakes, ponds, glaciers > 1 km^{2} (0.386 sq mi or 247 acres) and river estuaries.

Dompierre-sur-Charente (French pronunciation: [dɔ̃pjɛʁ syʁ ʃaʁɑ̃t]) is a commune in the Charente-Maritime department, southwestern France.

== Geography ==
The commune of Dompierre-sur-Charente is located in the east-central part of the Charente-Maritime department, in the Nouvelle-Aquitaine region and the former province of Saintonge. It can be associated with two major geographical regions: the Grand Ouest (Greater West) and the French Great South-West.

== History ==
In 1612, the Orlac estate was sold by Jacques Le Comte to Jacques de Verdelin, an ensign in the Duke of Épernon's *gendarme* company. Verdelin's daughter, Marie-Guillemette, married Jean-Louis de Bremond d'Ars—Marquis d'Ars and a *maréchal de camp* (major general) who was killed at the Siege of Cognac in 1651, the estate has remained in their family ever since.

The old château, already nearly in ruins by the time of the Revolution, was confiscated and sold on behalf of the Nation.

Before 1789, the commune's territory encompassed part of the territory of Chérac.

An ordinance dated 28 December 1825, merged the commune of Orlac into that of Dompierre-sur-Charente.

Before 16 September 1918, Dompierre-sur-Charente was simply named Dompierre.

=== Dompierre de France ===
Dompierre is a member of the *Association des Dompierre-de-France*, a group comprising 23 French communes that include "Dompierre" in their names. Each year, a different commune hosts the gathering that brings them together. Dompierre-sur-Charente hosted its fellow "Dompierre" communes in 2002. In 2013, the national gathering took place on the first weekend of July in Dompierre-les-Ormes, in the Saône-et-Loire department. 0

== Population ==
Historical population
Year	Pop.	±% p.a.
1968	381	—
1975	374	−0.26%
1982	359	−0.58%
1990	398	+1.30%
1999	414	+0.44%
2007	449	+1.02%
2012	488	+1.68%
2017	458	−1.26%
2023	477	+0.68%
Source: INSEE

== See also ==
- Communes of the Charente-Maritime department
