= Communauté d'agglomération de Saintes =

Saintes
- Communauté d'agglomération
- Interactive map of Saintes
- Coordinates: 45°44′N 00°37′W
- Country: France
- Region: Nouvelle-Aquitaine
- Department: Charente-Maritime
- No. of communes: {{{nbcomm}}}
- Established: 2013
- Area: 474.6 km^{2} (183.2 sq mi)
- Population (2019): 60,110
  - Density: 126.7/km^{2} (328.0/sq mi)
- Website: www.agglo-saintes.fr

Communauté d'agglomération de Saintes (since 2023: Saintes - Grandes Rives - L'Agglo) is the communauté d'agglomération, an intercommunal structure, centred on the town of Saintes. It is located in the Charente-Maritime department, in the Nouvelle-Aquitaine region, southwestern France. Created in 2013, its seat is in Saintes. Its area is 474.6 km^{2}. Its population was 60,110 in 2019, of which 25,287 in Saintes proper.

== Composition ==
The communauté d'agglomération consists of the following 36 communes:

1. Burie
2. Bussac-sur-Charente
3. Chaniers
4. La Chapelle-des-Pots
5. Chérac
6. Chermignac
7. La Clisse
8. Colombiers
9. Corme-Royal
10. Courcoury
11. Dompierre-sur-Charente
12. Le Douhet
13. Écoyeux
14. Écurat
15. Fontcouverte
16. Les Gonds
17. La Jard
18. Luchat
19. Migron
20. Montils
21. Pessines
22. Pisany
23. Préguillac
24. Rouffiac
25. Saint-Bris-des-Bois
26. Saint-Césaire
27. Saintes
28. Saint-Georges-des-Coteaux
29. Saint-Sauvant
30. Saint-Sever-de-Saintonge
31. Saint-Vaize
32. Le Seure
33. Thénac
34. Varzay
35. Vénérand
36. Villars-les-Bois
