= Saint-Vaize =

- Commune
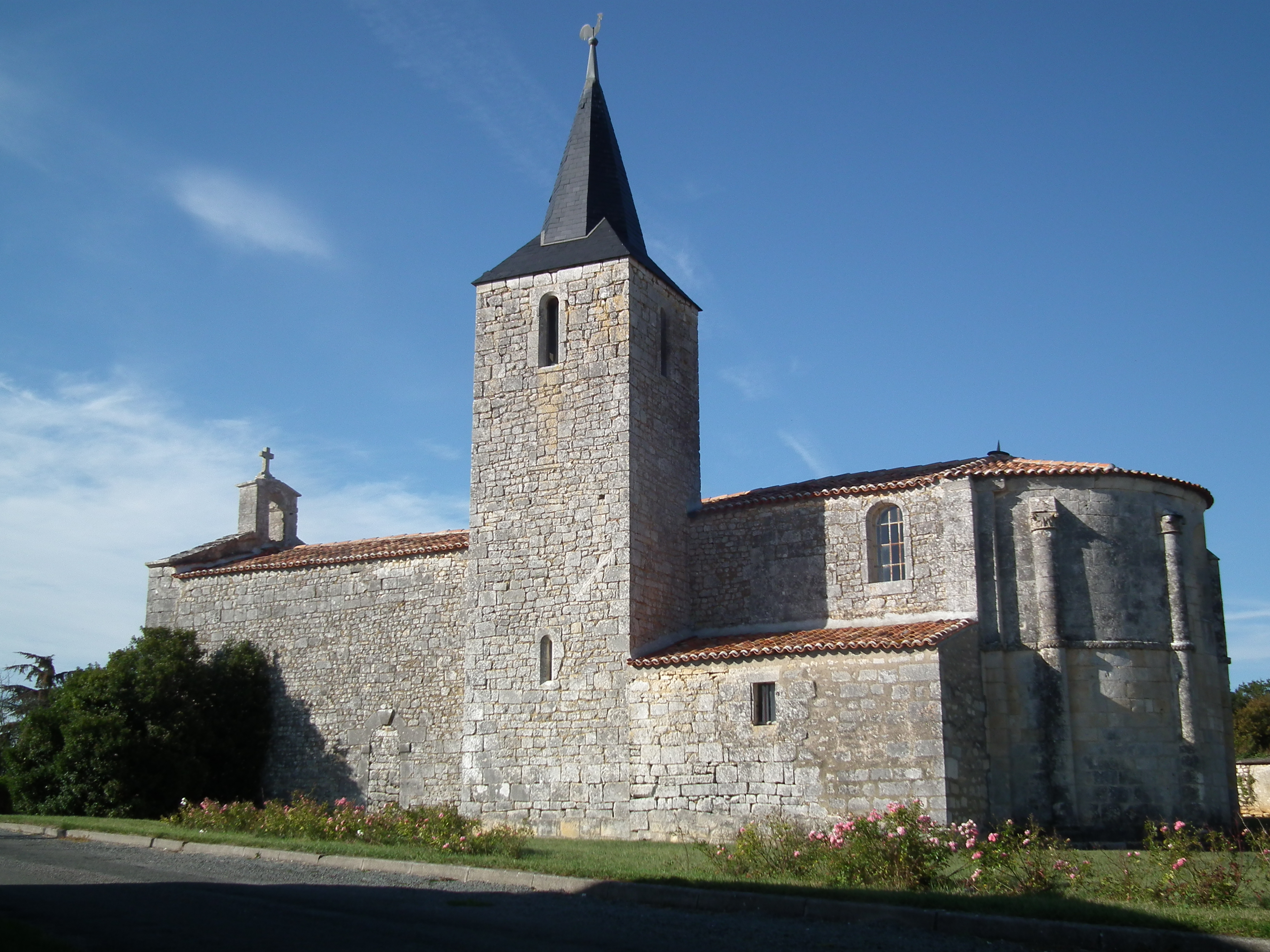
- The church in Saint-Vaize
- Location of Saint-Vaize
- Location within France Location within Nouvelle-Aquitaine
- Coordinates: 45°48′46″N 0°37′48″W
- Country: France
- Region: Nouvelle-Aquitaine
- Department: Charente-Maritime
- Arrondissement: Saintes
- Canton: Chaniers
- Intercommunality: CA Saintes

Government
  - Mayor (2020–2026): Michel Roux
- Area^{1}: 4.61 km^{2} (1.78 sq mi)
- Elevation: 40 m (130 ft)
- Highest elevation: 57 m (187 ft)
- Lowest elevation: 2 m (6.6 ft)
- Population (2023): 620
  - Density: 130/km^{2} (350/sq mi)
- Time zone: UTC+01:00 (CET)
  - Summer (DST): UTC+02:00 (CEST)
- INSEE/Postal code: 17412 /17100
- ^{1} French Land Register data, which excludes lakes, ponds, glaciers > 1 km^{2} (0.386 sq mi or 247 acres) and river estuaries.

Saint-Vaize (French pronunciation: [sɛ̃ vɛz]) is a commune in the Charente-Maritime department in southwestern France.

== Population ==
Historical population
Year	Pop.	±% p.a.
1968	358	—
1975	337	−0.86%
1982	442	+3.95%
1990	477	+0.96%
1999	463	−0.33%
2007	557	+2.34%
2012	560	+0.11%
2017	651	+3.06%
2023	620	−0.81%
Source: INSEE

== See also ==
- Communes of the Charente-Maritime department
