= Vénérand =

- Commune
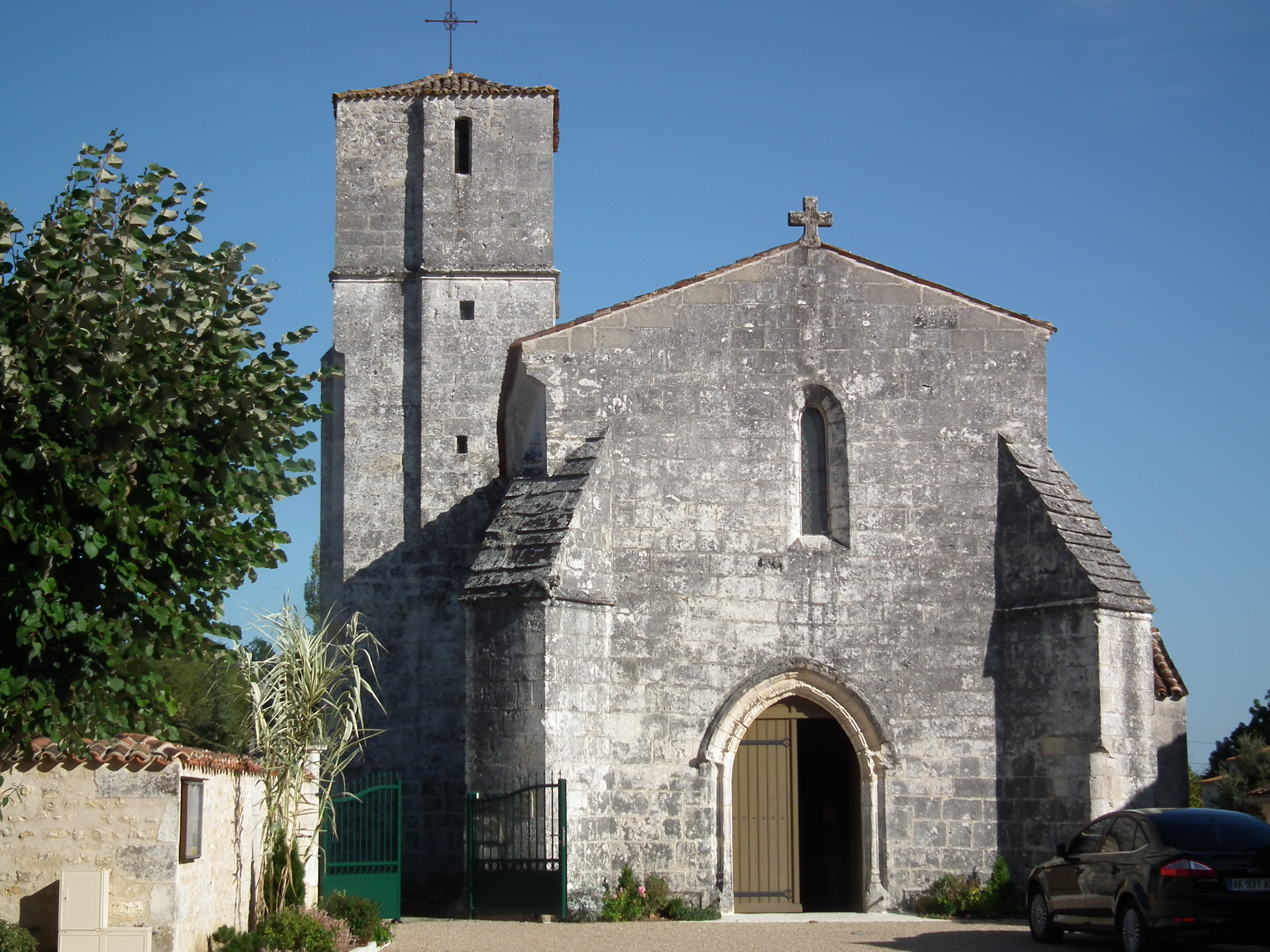
- The church in Vénérand

- Coat of arms
- Location of Vénérand
- Location within France Location within Nouvelle-Aquitaine
- Coordinates: 45°47′39″N 0°33′33″W
- Country: France
- Region: Nouvelle-Aquitaine
- Department: Charente-Maritime
- Arrondissement: Saintes
- Canton: Chaniers
- Intercommunality: CA Saintes

Government
  - Mayor (2020–2026): Françoise Libourel
- Area^{1}: 9.65 km^{2} (3.73 sq mi)
- Elevation: 86 m (282 ft)
- Highest elevation: 94 m (308 ft)
- Lowest elevation: 49 m (161 ft)
- Population (2023): 771
  - Density: 79.9/km^{2} (207/sq mi)
- Time zone: UTC+01:00 (CET)
  - Summer (DST): UTC+02:00 (CEST)
- INSEE/Postal code: 17462 /17100
- ^{1} French Land Register data, which excludes lakes, ponds, glaciers > 1 km^{2} (0.386 sq mi or 247 acres) and river estuaries.

Vénérand (French pronunciation: [veneʁɑ̃]) is a commune in the Charente-Maritime department in southwestern France.

== Population ==
Historical population
Year	Pop.	±% p.a.
1968	377	—
1975	387	+0.37%
1982	528	+4.54%
1990	538	+0.23%
1999	598	+1.18%
2007	678	+1.58%
2012	742	+1.82%
2017	761	+0.51%
2023	771	+0.22%
Source: INSEE

== See also ==
- Communes of the Charente-Maritime department
