= Juicq =

- Commune
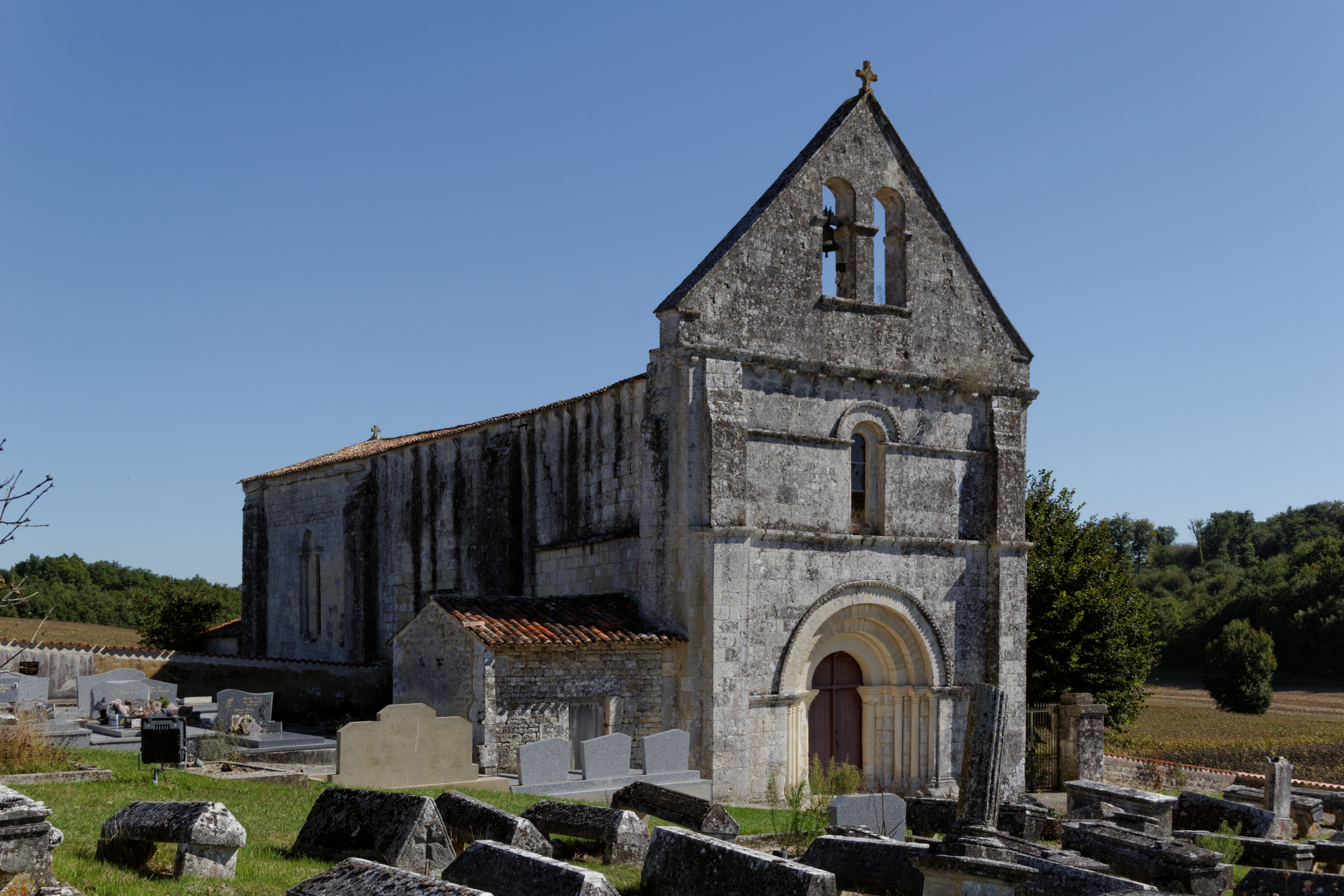
- The church in Juicq
- Location of Juicq
- Location within France Location within Nouvelle-Aquitaine
- Coordinates: 45°50′40″N 0°33′33″W
- Country: France
- Region: Nouvelle-Aquitaine
- Department: Charente-Maritime
- Arrondissement: Saint-Jean-d'Angély
- Canton: Chaniers

Government
  - Mayor (2020–2026): Olivier Fouché
- Area^{1}: 9.25 km^{2} (3.57 sq mi)
- Elevation: 70 m (230 ft)
- Highest elevation: 76 m (249 ft)
- Lowest elevation: 16 m (52 ft)
- Population (2023): 320
  - Density: 35/km^{2} (90/sq mi)
- Time zone: UTC+01:00 (CET)
  - Summer (DST): UTC+02:00 (CEST)
- INSEE/Postal code: 17198 /17770
- ^{1} French Land Register data, which excludes lakes, ponds, glaciers > 1 km^{2} (0.386 sq mi or 247 acres) and river estuaries.

Juicq (French pronunciation: [ʒɥik]) is a commune in the Charente-Maritime department in southwestern France.

== Population ==
Historical population
Year	Pop.	±% p.a.
1968	134	—
1975	131	−0.32%
1982	158	+2.71%
1990	169	+0.84%
1999	165	−0.27%
2007	181	+1.16%
2012	261	+7.60%
2017	294	+2.41%
2023	320	+1.42%
Source: INSEE

== See also ==
- Communes of the Charente-Maritime department
