= La Chapelle-des-Pots =

- Commune
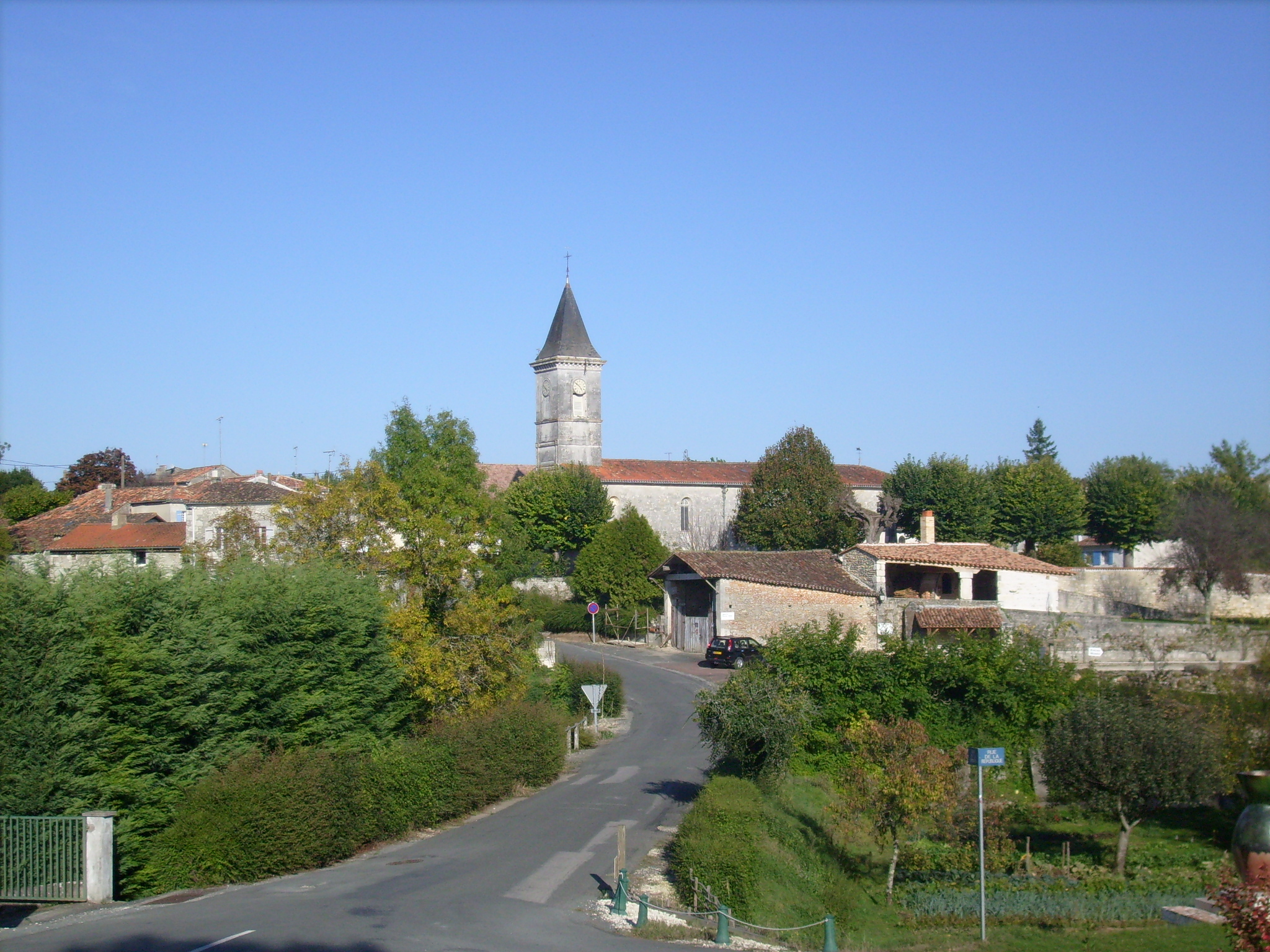
- A general view of La Chapelle-des-Pots

- Coat of arms
- Location of La Chapelle-des-Pots
- Location within France Location within Nouvelle-Aquitaine
- Coordinates: 45°45′38″N 0°32′22″W
- Country: France
- Region: Nouvelle-Aquitaine
- Department: Charente-Maritime
- Arrondissement: Saintes
- Canton: Chaniers
- Intercommunality: CA Saintes

Government
  - Mayor (2020–2026): Pierre-Henri Jallais
- Area^{1}: 10.27 km^{2} (3.97 sq mi)
- Highest elevation: 88 m (289 ft)
- Lowest elevation: 19 m (62 ft)
- Population (2023): 1,019
  - Density: 99.22/km^{2} (257.0/sq mi)
- Time zone: UTC+01:00 (CET)
  - Summer (DST): UTC+02:00 (CEST)
- INSEE/Postal code: 17089 /17100
- ^{1} French Land Register data, which excludes lakes, ponds, glaciers > 1 km^{2} (0.386 sq mi or 247 acres) and river estuaries.

La Chapelle-des-Pots (French pronunciation: [la ʃapɛl de po]) is a commune in the center-east of the Charente-Maritime department in southwestern France, in the former province of Saintonge.

== History ==
La Chapelle-des-Pots is a village where potters make ceramics for more than eight centuries. Many woods, brooks and local clay allowed the creation of ceramics. Bernard Palissy even worked with local potters.

== Population ==
Historical population
Year	Pop.	±% p.a.
1968	550	—
1975	694	+3.38%
1982	823	+2.47%
1990	890	+0.98%
1999	875	−0.19%
2007	890	+0.21%
2012	980	+1.95%
2017	1,002	+0.45%
2023	1,019	+0.28%
Source: INSEE

== Places and monuments ==
In the center of the town: a fountain covered with a dome made of cut stone and thrown into a wash-house, the church of Saint-Front (1786), whose foundations use stones from the old potters' chapel (Municipal Bulletin). A ceramic kiln built in 2006 of the chain type located near the town hall, an old ceramic kiln, call Varoqeau kiln, inscribed in historical monuments.

A school group inaugurated in 1955.

The municipality had an interesting regional museum: the Saintongean Ceramics Museum, where collections of local pottery from XIIIe to XXe. This museum, founded under the mandate of Raymond Viollier was closed by the current municipality.

Exterior of the borough: old seigniory, several small stone washhouses, numerous hiking trails VTT and pedestrian.

== Environmental Heritage ==
The GR 4 which runs from Royan to Grasse crosses the town and runs along the fountain of the center of the town.

== Gallery ==
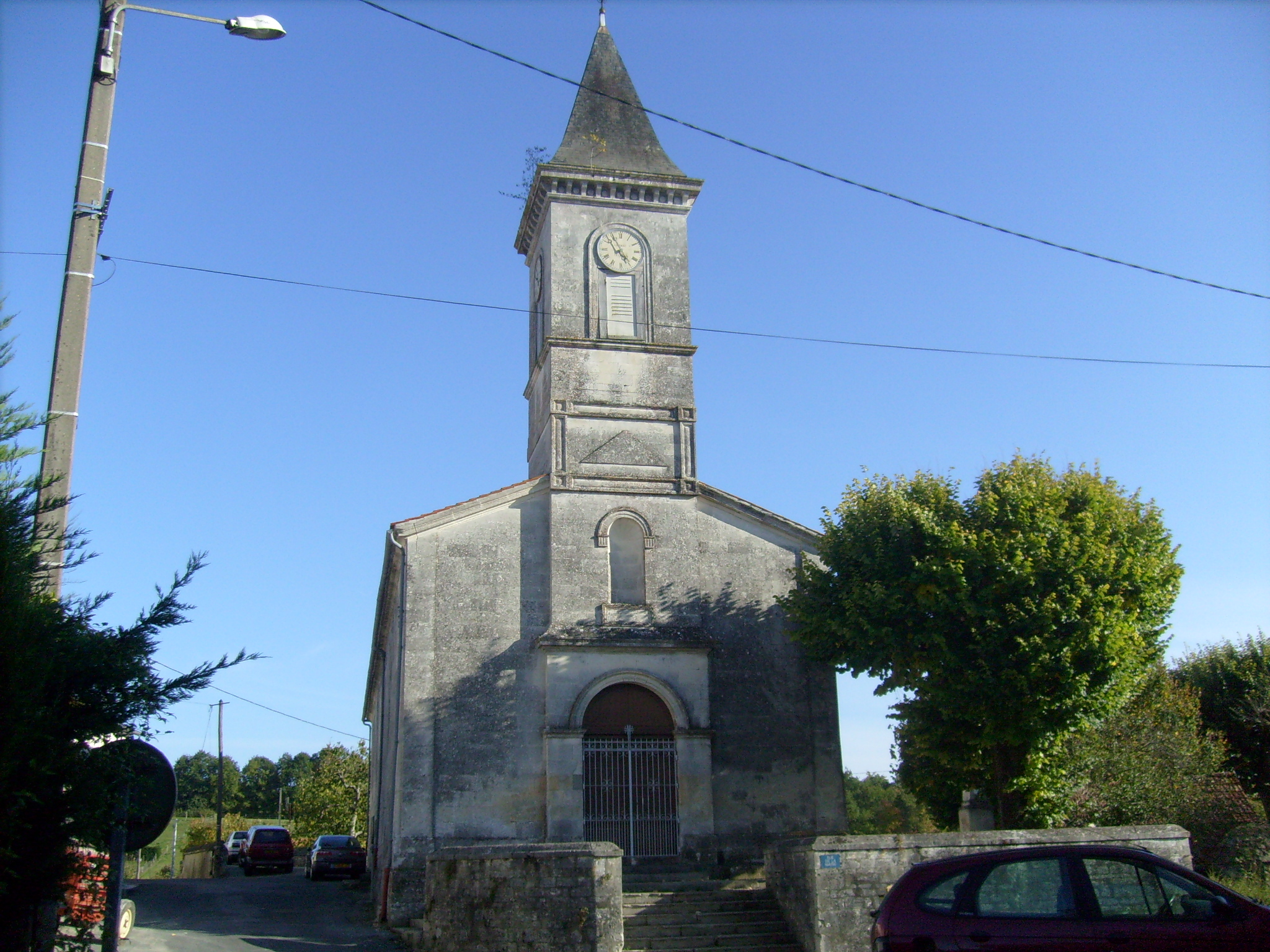
La Chapelle-des-Pots Neoclassical church

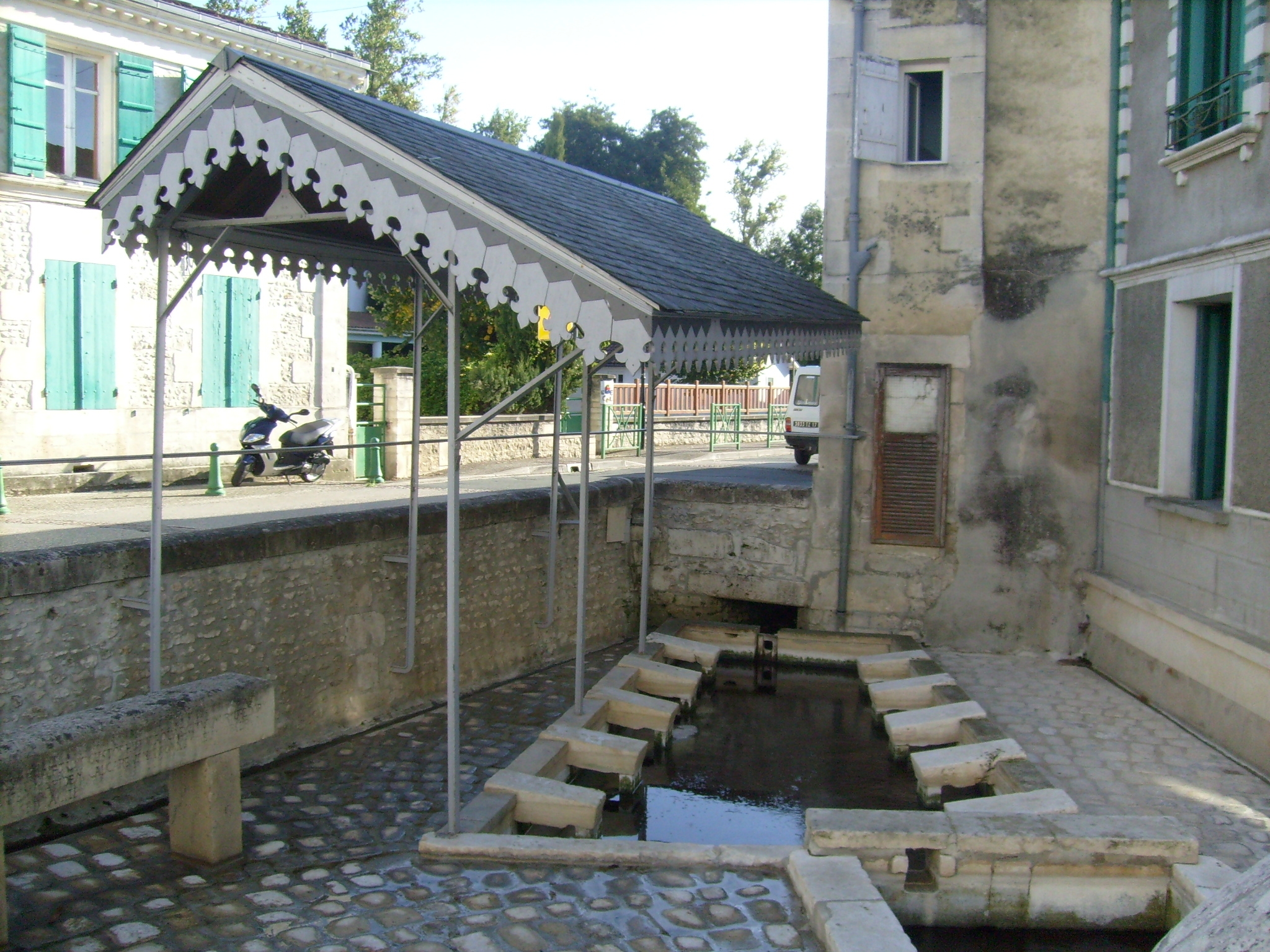
Lavoir

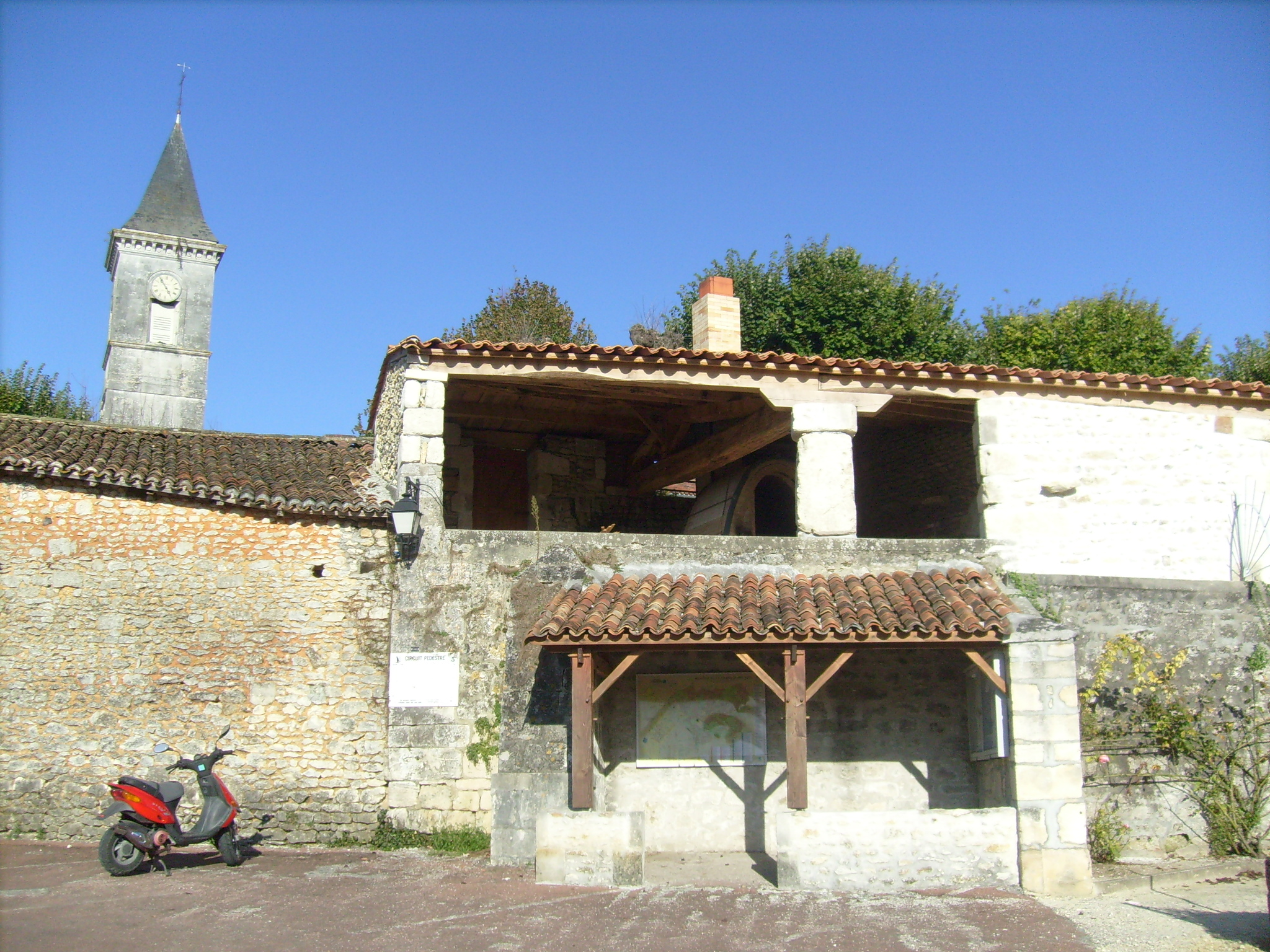
Oven

== See also ==
- Communes of the Charente-Maritime department
- Cognac, France
