= Villars-les-Bois =

- Commune
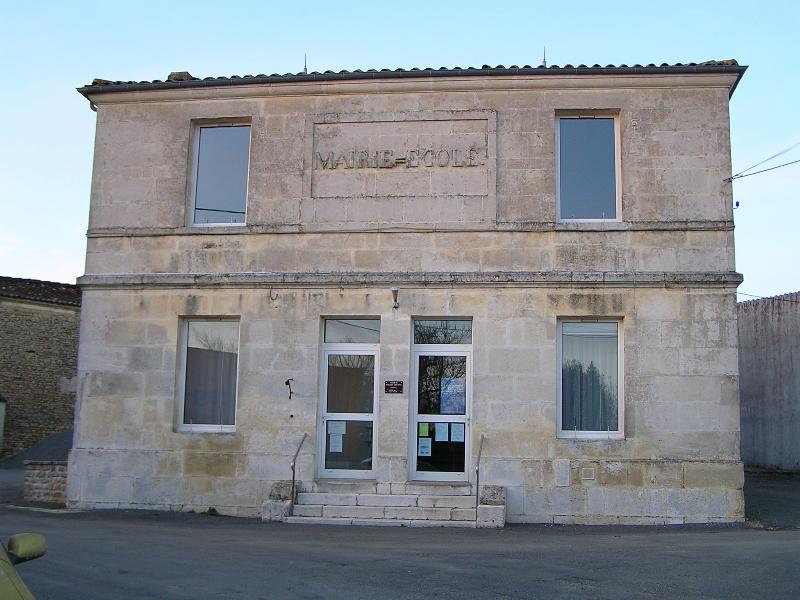
- Town hall
- Location of Villars-les-Bois
- Location within France Location within Nouvelle-Aquitaine
- Coordinates: 45°48′39″N 0°26′09″W
- Country: France
- Region: Nouvelle-Aquitaine
- Department: Charente-Maritime
- Arrondissement: Saintes
- Canton: Chaniers
- Intercommunality: CA Saintes

Government
  - Mayor (2020–2026): Fabrice Barusseau
- Area^{1}: 8.60 km^{2} (3.32 sq mi)
- Highest elevation: 101 m (331 ft)
- Lowest elevation: 17 m (56 ft)
- Population (2023): 257
  - Density: 29.9/km^{2} (77.4/sq mi)
- Time zone: UTC+01:00 (CET)
  - Summer (DST): UTC+02:00 (CEST)
- INSEE/Postal code: 17470 /17770
- ^{1} French Land Register data, which excludes lakes, ponds, glaciers > 1 km^{2} (0.386 sq mi or 247 acres) and river estuaries.

Villars-les-Bois (French pronunciation: [vilaʁ le bwa]) is a commune in the Charente-Maritime department in southwestern France.

== Population ==
Historical population
Year	Pop.	±% p.a.
1968	313	—
1975	281	−1.53%
1982	263	−0.94%
1990	256	−0.34%
1999	256	+0.00%
2007	249	−0.35%
2012	263	+1.10%
2017	246	−1.33%
2023	257	+0.73%
Source: INSEE

== See also ==
- Communes of the Charente-Maritime department
