= Saint-Sauvant, Charente-Maritime =

Saint-Sauvant
- Commune
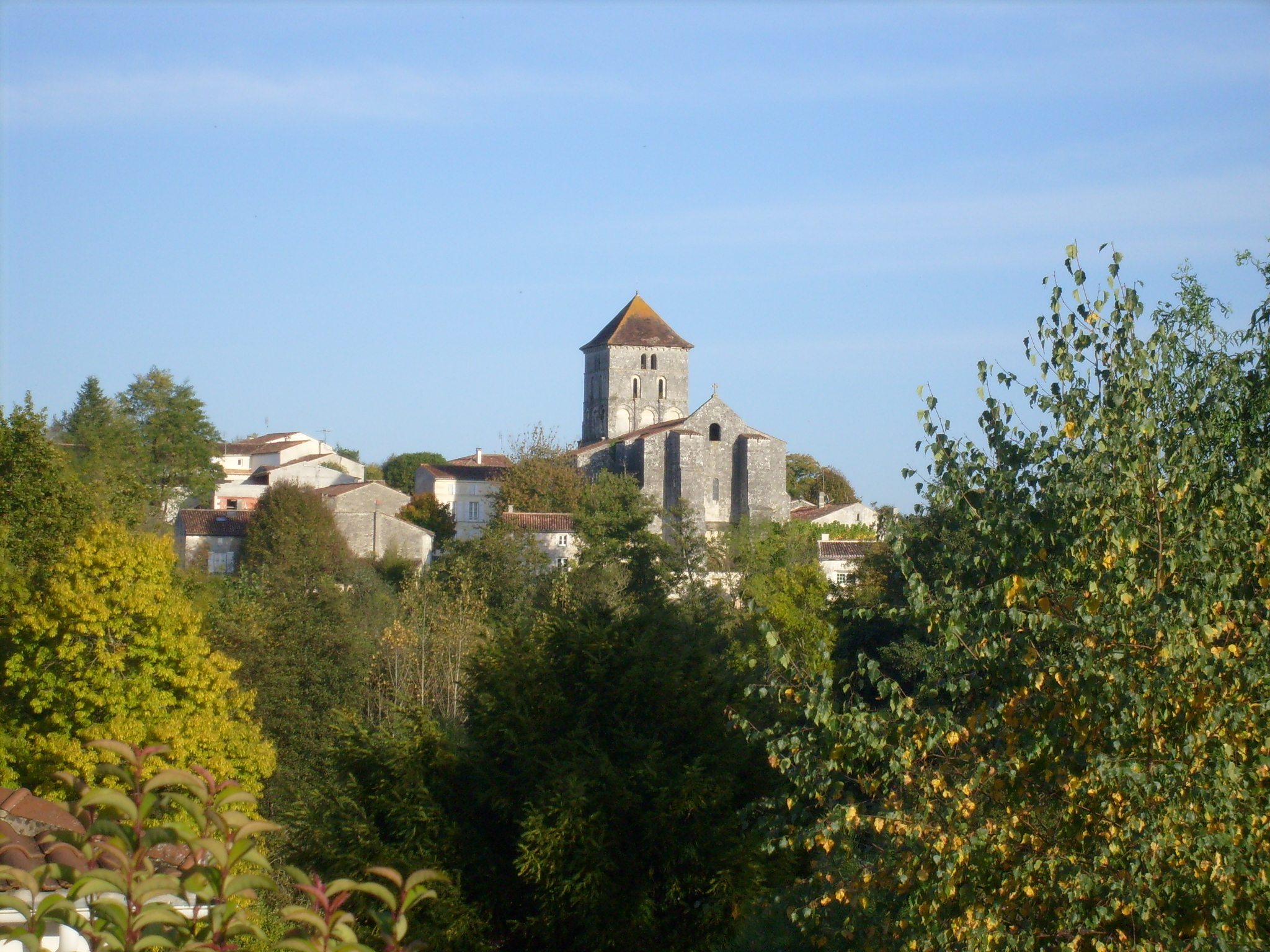
- A general view of Saint-Sauvant
- Location of Saint-Sauvant
- Location within France Location within Nouvelle-Aquitaine
- Coordinates: 45°44′24″N 0°30′10″W
- Country: France
- Region: Nouvelle-Aquitaine
- Department: Charente-Maritime
- Arrondissement: Saintes
- Canton: Chaniers
- Intercommunality: CA Saintes

Government
  - Mayor (2020–2026): Jean-Marc Audouin
- Area^{1}: 7.05 km^{2} (2.72 sq mi)
- Elevation: 40 m (130 ft)
- Highest elevation: 79 m (259 ft)
- Lowest elevation: 8 m (26 ft)
- Population (2023): 515
  - Density: 73.0/km^{2} (189/sq mi)
- Time zone: UTC+01:00 (CET)
  - Summer (DST): UTC+02:00 (CEST)
- INSEE/Postal code: 17395 /17610
- ^{1} French Land Register data, which excludes lakes, ponds, glaciers > 1 km^{2} (0.386 sq mi or 247 acres) and river estuaries.

Saint-Sauvant (French pronunciation: [sɛ̃ sovɑ̃]) is a commune in the Charente-Maritime department in southwestern France.

== Population ==
Historical population
Year	Pop.	±% p.a.
1968	481	—
1975	462	−0.57%
1982	504	+1.25%
1990	501	−0.07%
1999	512	+0.24%
2007	514	+0.05%
2012	505	−0.35%
2017	485	−0.80%
2023	515	+1.01%
Source: INSEE

== See also ==
- Communes of the Charente-Maritime department
