= Aujac, Charente-Maritime =

Aujac
- Commune
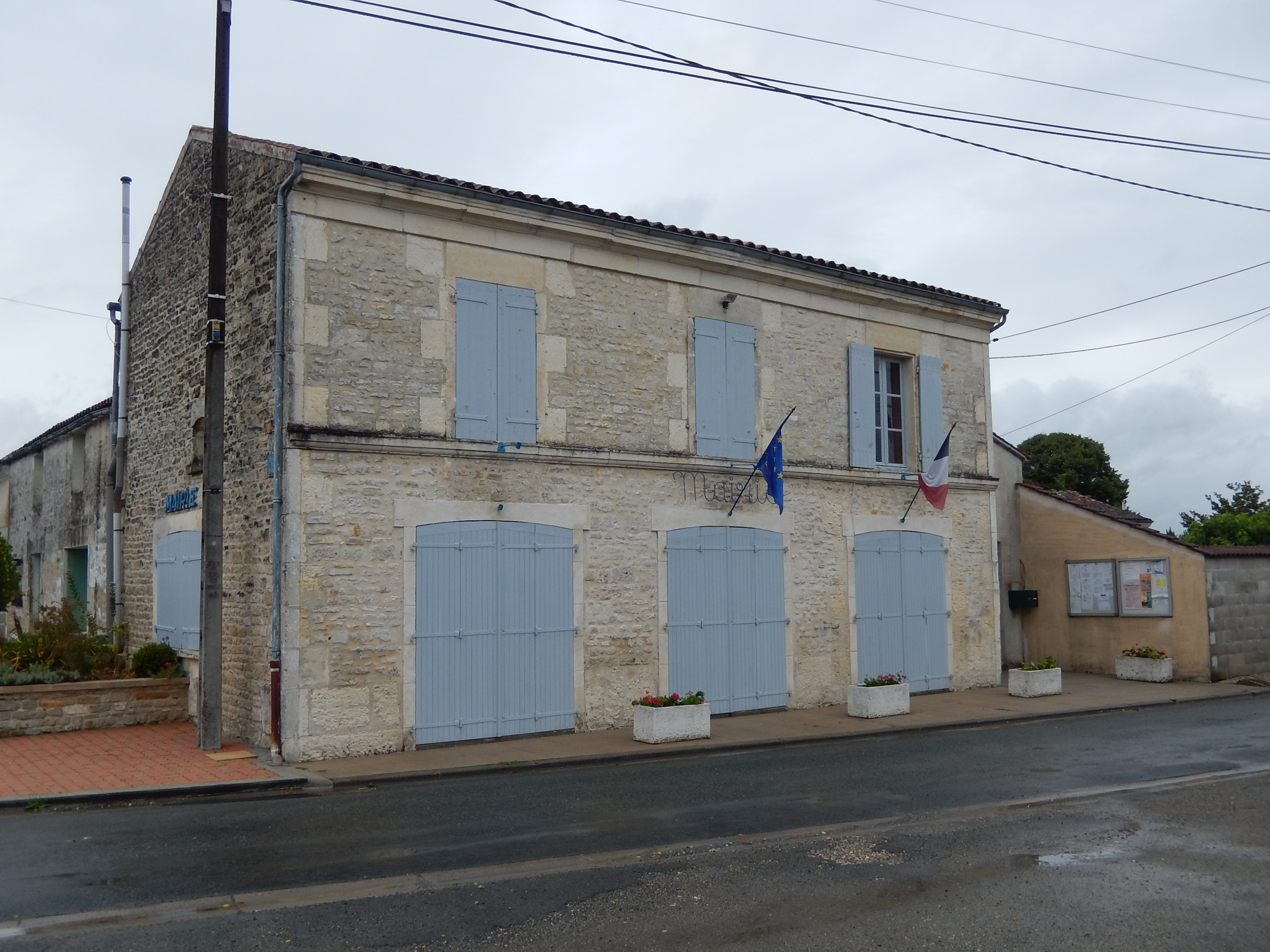
- The town hall in Aujac
- Location of Aujac
- Location within France Location within Nouvelle-Aquitaine
- Coordinates: 45°50′42″N 0°23′38″W
- Country: France
- Region: Nouvelle-Aquitaine
- Department: Charente-Maritime
- Arrondissement: Saint-Jean-d'Angély
- Canton: Chaniers
- Intercommunality: CC Vals Saintonge

Government
  - Mayor (2020–2026): Bruno Sogues
- Area^{1}: 8.73 km^{2} (3.37 sq mi)
- Elevation: 24 m (79 ft)
- Highest elevation: 33 m (108 ft)
- Lowest elevation: 16 m (52 ft)
- Population (2023): 372
  - Density: 42.6/km^{2} (110/sq mi)
- Time zone: UTC+01:00 (CET)
  - Summer (DST): UTC+02:00 (CEST)
- INSEE/Postal code: 17023 /17770
- ^{1} French Land Register data, which excludes lakes, ponds, glaciers > 1 km^{2} (0.386 sq mi or 247 acres) and river estuaries.

Aujac (French pronunciation: [oʒak]) is a commune in the department of Charente-Maritime in the Nouvelle-Aquitaine region in southwestern France.

== History ==
The records of the parishes in 1686 say that Aujac produces grain, wine and has grasslands.

== Administration ==
List of successive mayors:

| Name | Election to office | Left office |
|---|---|---|
| Jean-Michel Baron | March 2001 | March 2008 |
| Claude Rulland | March 2008 | 2020 |
| Bruno Sogues | May 2020 | incumbent |

== Population ==
Historical population
| Year | Pop. | ±% p.a. |
|---|---|---|
| 1968 | 373 | — |
| 1975 | 363 | −0.39% |
| 1982 | 351 | −0.48% |
| 1990 | 321 | −1.11% |
| 1999 | 325 | +0.14% |
| 2007 | 317 | −0.31% |
| 2012 | 334 | +1.05% |
| 2017 | 369 | +2.01% |
| 2023 | 372 | +0.14% |
Source: INSEE

== Sights ==
=== Fontaine de l'Oriou ===
An abundant source of water with many underground sources.

=== Église Saint-Martin ===
A Romanesque church dating from the twelfth century which was altered greatly during the invasion of the Moors. Evidence of the 3 changes (From Christianity, to Islam and back to Christianity) can be seen in the church.

== See also ==
- Communes of the Charente-Maritime department
