= Saint-Bris-des-Bois =

- Commune
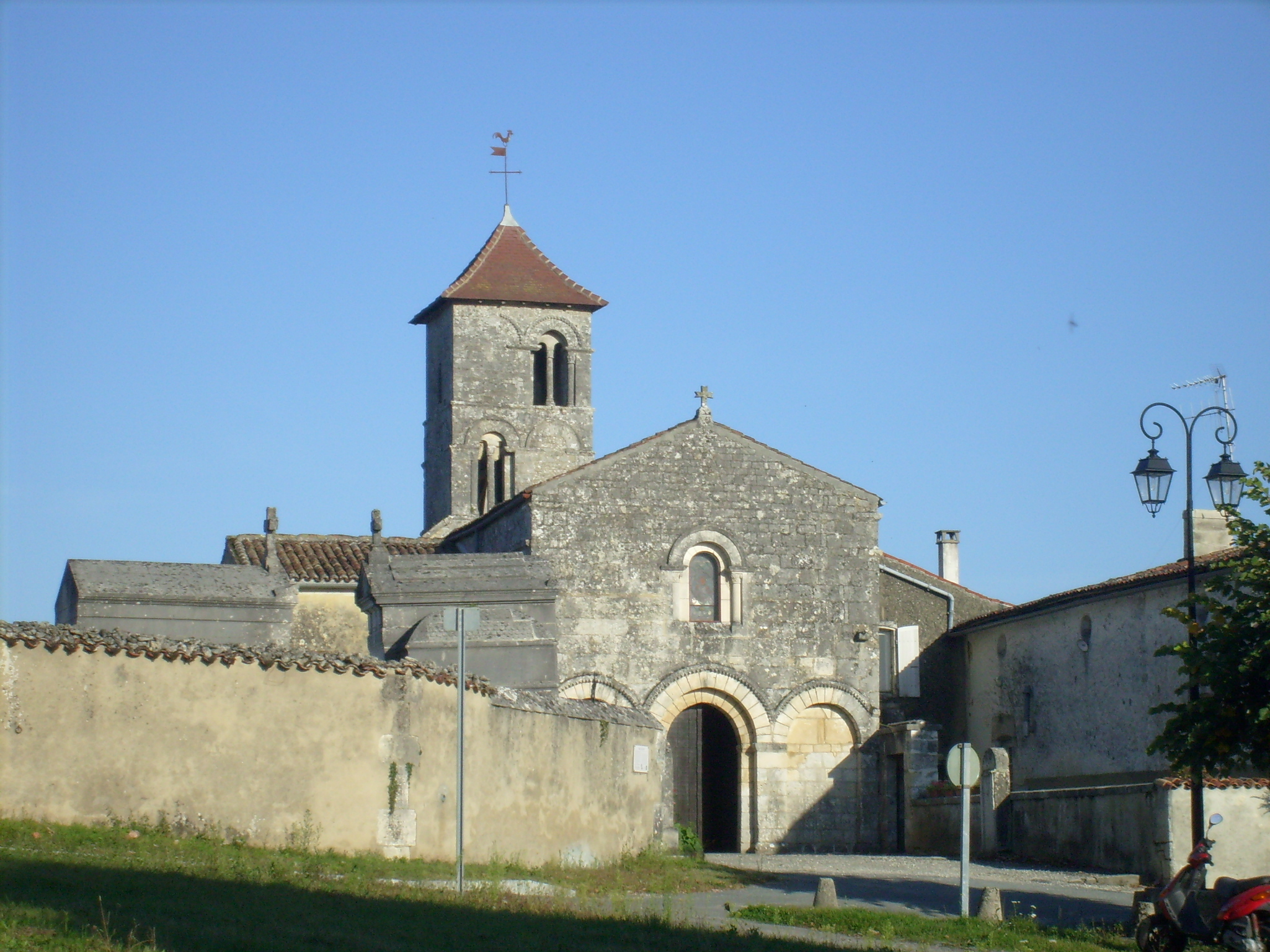
- The church in Saint-Bris-des-Bois
- Location of Saint-Bris-des-Bois
- Location within France Location within Nouvelle-Aquitaine
- Coordinates: 45°46′02″N 0°29′18″W
- Country: France
- Region: Nouvelle-Aquitaine
- Department: Charente-Maritime
- Arrondissement: Saintes
- Canton: Chaniers
- Intercommunality: CA Saintes

Government
  - Mayor (2020–2026): Bernard Combeau
- Area^{1}: 9.06 km^{2} (3.50 sq mi)
- Elevation: 40 m (130 ft)
- Highest elevation: 95 m (312 ft)
- Lowest elevation: 31 m (102 ft)
- Population (2023): 388
  - Density: 42.8/km^{2} (111/sq mi)
- Time zone: UTC+01:00 (CET)
  - Summer (DST): UTC+02:00 (CEST)
- INSEE/Postal code: 17313 /17770
- ^{1} French Land Register data, which excludes lakes, ponds, glaciers > 1 km^{2} (0.386 sq mi or 247 acres) and river estuaries.

Saint-Bris-des-Bois (French pronunciation: [sɛ̃ bʁi de bwa]) is a commune in the Charente-Maritime department in southwestern France.

== Population ==
Historical population
Year	Pop.	±% p.a.
1968	260	—
1975	267	+0.38%
1982	285	+0.94%
1990	359	+2.93%
1999	391	+0.95%
2007	414	+0.72%
2012	406	−0.39%
2017	389	−0.85%
2023	388	−0.04%
Source: INSEE

== See also ==
- Communes of the Charente-Maritime department
