= Canton of Chaniers =

Coordinates: 45.72°N 0.55°W

The canton of Chaniers is an administrative division of the Charente-Maritime department, western France. It was created at the French canton reorganisation which came into effect in March 2015. Its seat is in Chaniers.

It consists of the following communes:

1. Aujac
2. Aumagne
3. Authon-Ébéon
4. Bercloux
5. Brizambourg
6. Burie
7. Bussac-sur-Charente
8. Chaniers
9. La Chapelle-des-Pots
10. Chérac
11. Dompierre-sur-Charente
12. Le Douhet
13. Écoyeux
14. Fontcouverte
15. Juicq
16. Migron
17. Nantillé
18. Saint-Bris-des-Bois
19. Saint-Césaire
20. Sainte-Même
21. Saint-Hilaire-de-Villefranche
22. Saint-Sauvant
23. Saint-Vaize
24. Le Seure
25. Vénérand
26. Villars-les-Bois
