= Le Seure =

- Commune
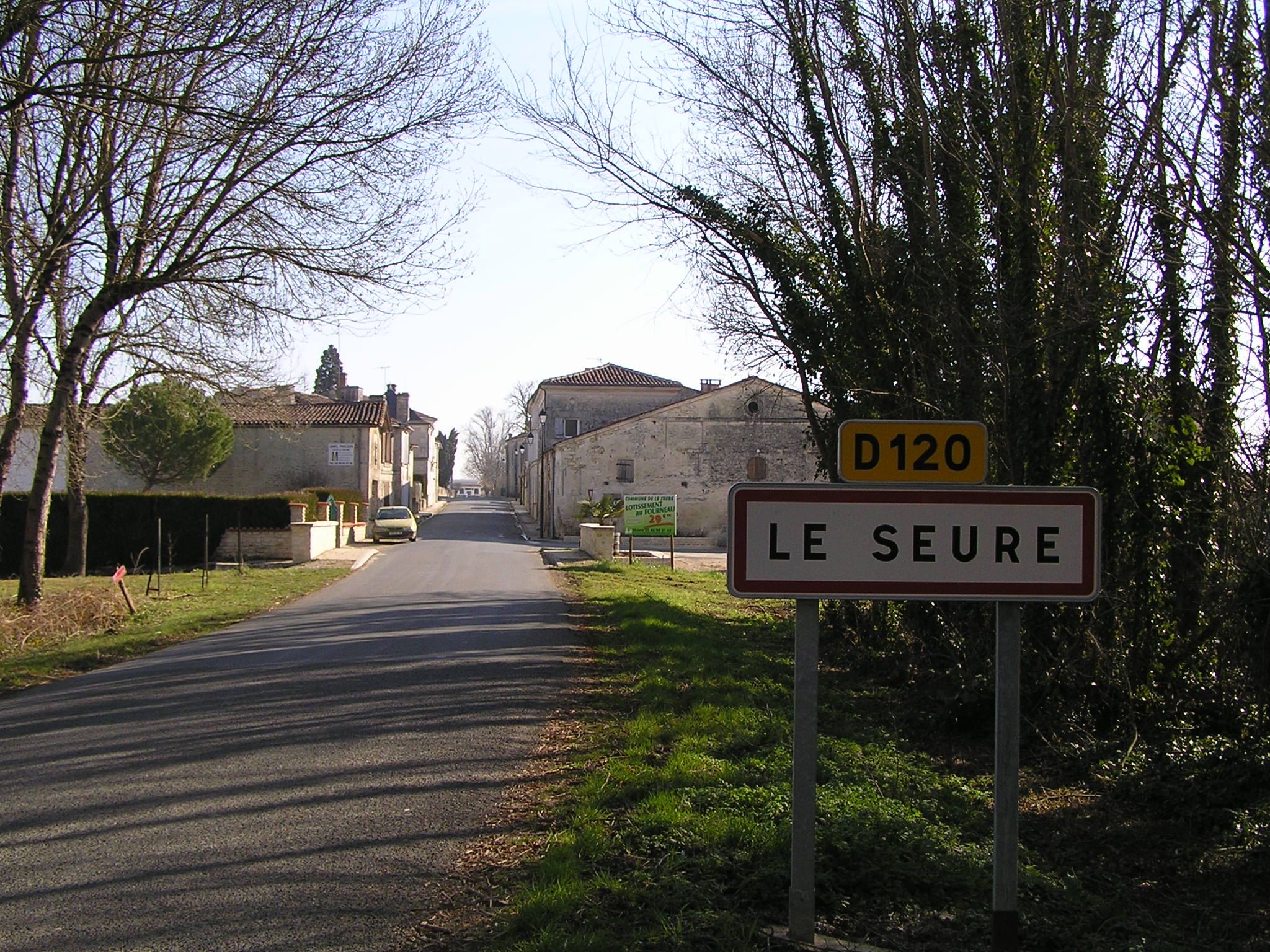
- The road into Le Seure
- Location of Le Seure
- Location within France Location within Nouvelle-Aquitaine
- Coordinates: 45°47′24″N 0°21′56″W
- Country: France
- Region: Nouvelle-Aquitaine
- Department: Charente-Maritime
- Arrondissement: Saintes
- Canton: Chaniers
- Intercommunality: CA Saintes

Government
  - Mayor (2020–2026): Sylvie Churlaud
- Area^{1}: 5.68 km^{2} (2.19 sq mi)
- Highest elevation: 26 m (85 ft)
- Lowest elevation: 11 m (36 ft)
- Population (2023): 274
  - Density: 48.2/km^{2} (125/sq mi)
- Time zone: UTC+01:00 (CET)
  - Summer (DST): UTC+02:00 (CEST)
- INSEE/Postal code: 17426 /17770
- ^{1} French Land Register data, which excludes lakes, ponds, glaciers > 1 km^{2} (0.386 sq mi or 247 acres) and river estuaries.

Le Seure (French pronunciation: [lə sœʁ]) is a commune in the Charente-Maritime department in southwestern France.

== Population ==
Historical population
| Year | Pop. | ±% p.a. |
|---|---|---|
| 1968 | 239 | — |
| 1975 | 215 | −1.50% |
| 1982 | 203 | −0.82% |
| 1990 | 207 | +0.24% |
| 1999 | 214 | +0.37% |
| 2007 | 238 | +1.34% |
| 2012 | 233 | −0.42% |
| 2017 | 255 | +1.82% |
| 2023 | 274 | +1.20% |
Source: INSEE

== See also ==
- Communes of the Charente-Maritime department
