= Burie =

- Commune
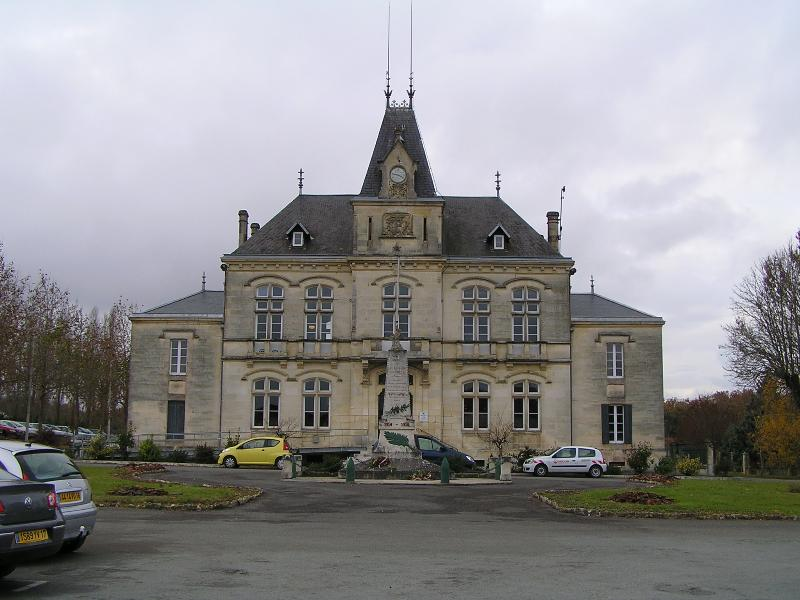
- Town hall
- Location of Burie
- Location within France Location within Nouvelle-Aquitaine
- Coordinates: 45°46′24″N 0°25′16″W
- Country: France
- Region: Nouvelle-Aquitaine
- Department: Charente-Maritime
- Arrondissement: Saintes
- Canton: Chaniers
- Intercommunality: CA Saintes

Government
  - Mayor (2020–2026): Gerard Perrin
- Area^{1}: 9.19 km^{2} (3.55 sq mi)
- Highest elevation: 103 m (338 ft)
- Lowest elevation: 19 m (62 ft)
- Population (2023): 1,338
  - Density: 146/km^{2} (377/sq mi)
- Time zone: UTC+01:00 (CET)
  - Summer (DST): UTC+02:00 (CEST)
- INSEE/Postal code: 17072 /17770
- ^{1} French Land Register data, which excludes lakes, ponds, glaciers > 1 km^{2} (0.386 sq mi or 247 acres) and river estuaries.

Burie (French pronunciation: [byʁi]) is a commune in the Charente-Maritime department in southwestern France.

== Population ==
Historical population
Year	Pop.	±% p.a.
1968	1,263	—
1975	1,165	−1.15%
1982	1,111	−0.68%
1990	1,209	+1.06%
1999	1,261	+0.47%
2007	1,259	−0.02%
2012	1,271	+0.19%
2017	1,279	+0.13%
2023	1,338	+0.75%
Source: INSEE

== See also ==
- Communes of the Charente-Maritime department
