= Brizambourg =

- Commune
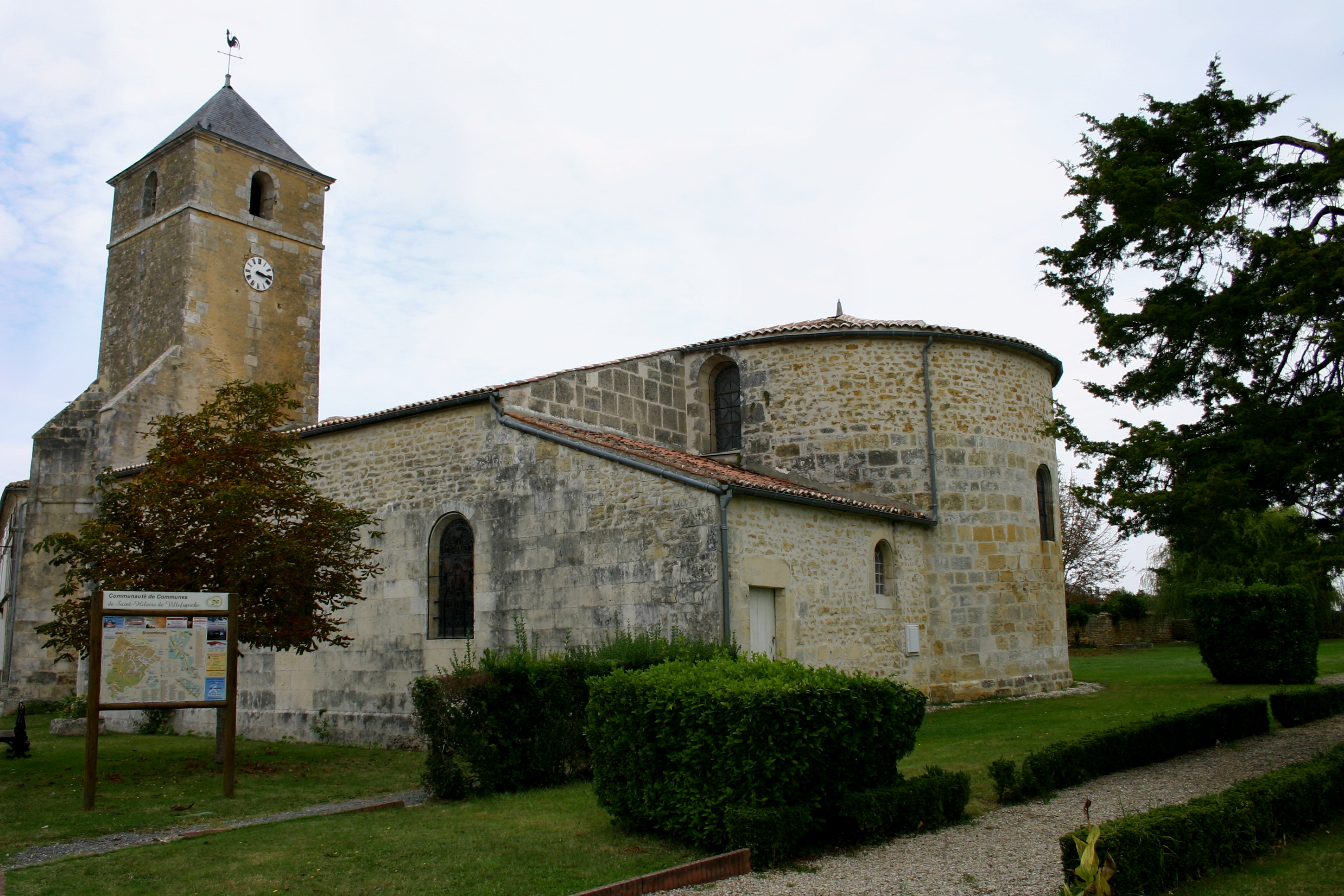
- The church in Brizambourg

- Coat of arms
- Location of Brizambourg
- Location within France Location within Nouvelle-Aquitaine
- Coordinates: 45°49′24″N 0°28′44″W
- Country: France
- Region: Nouvelle-Aquitaine
- Department: Charente-Maritime
- Arrondissement: Saint-Jean-d'Angély
- Canton: Chaniers

Government
  - Mayor (2020–2026): Didier Cosset
- Area^{1}: 21.26 km^{2} (8.21 sq mi)
- Elevation: 53 m (174 ft)
- Highest elevation: 94 m (308 ft)
- Lowest elevation: 26 m (85 ft)
- Population (2023): 997
  - Density: 46.9/km^{2} (121/sq mi)
- Time zone: UTC+01:00 (CET)
  - Summer (DST): UTC+02:00 (CEST)
- INSEE/Postal code: 17070 /17770
- ^{1} French Land Register data, which excludes lakes, ponds, glaciers > 1 km^{2} (0.386 sq mi or 247 acres) and river estuaries.

Brizambourg (French pronunciation: [bʁizɑ̃buʁ]) is a commune in the Charente-Maritime department in southwestern France.

== Population ==
Historical population
Year	Pop.	±% p.a.
1968	787	—
1975	792	+0.09%
1982	747	−0.83%
1990	790	+0.70%
1999	763	−0.39%
2007	856	+1.45%
2012	862	+0.14%
2017	905	+0.98%
2023	997	+1.63%
Source: INSEE

== See also ==
- Communes of the Charente-Maritime department
