= Fontcouverte, Charente-Maritime =

Fontcouverte
- Commune
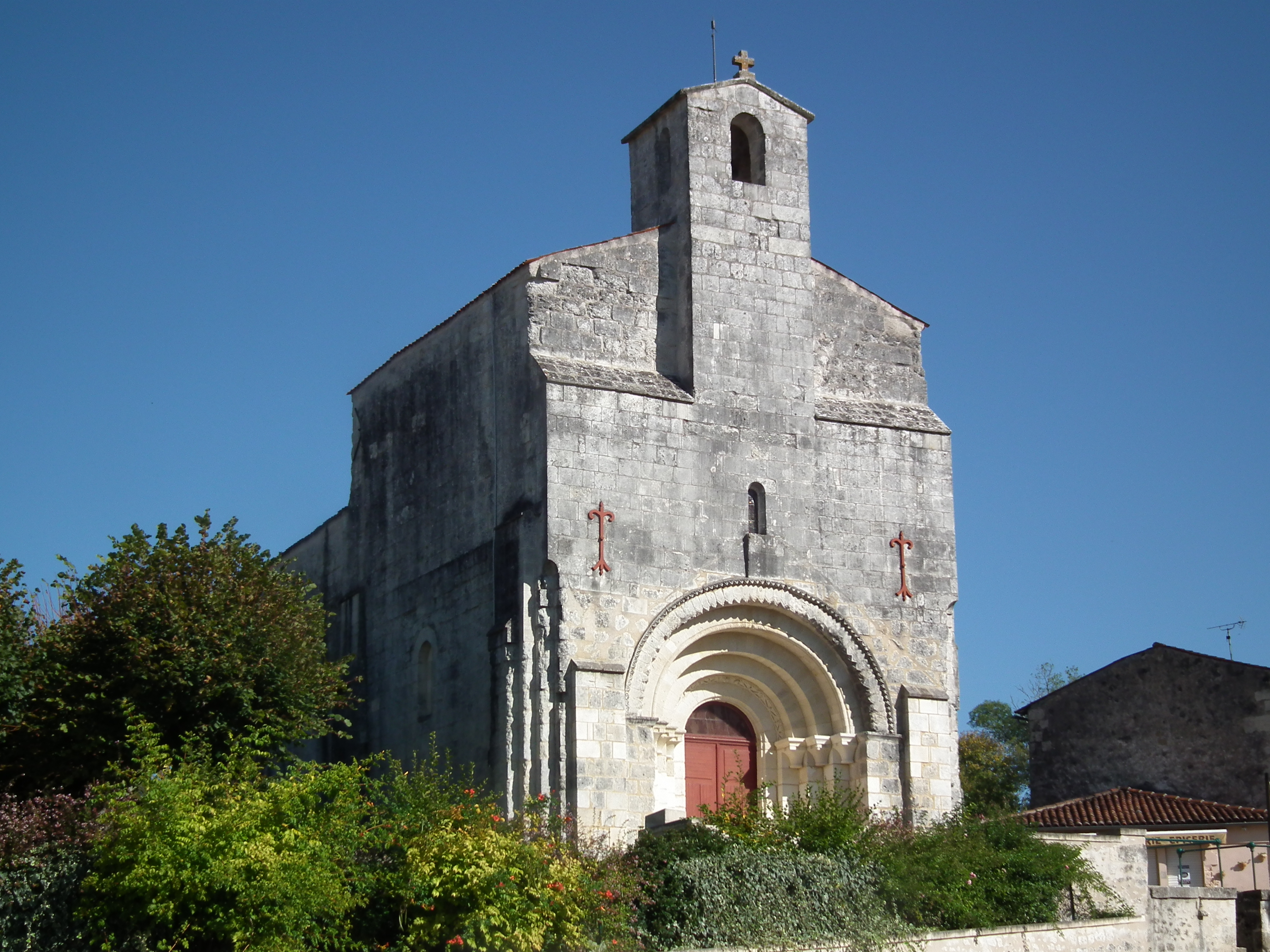
- The church in Fontcouverte
- Location of Fontcouverte
- Location within France Location within Nouvelle-Aquitaine
- Coordinates: 45°46′21″N 0°35′25″W
- Country: France
- Region: Nouvelle-Aquitaine
- Department: Charente-Maritime
- Arrondissement: Saintes
- Canton: Chaniers
- Intercommunality: CA Saintes

Government
  - Mayor (2020–2026): Francis Grellier
- Area^{1}: 11.58 km^{2} (4.47 sq mi)
- Elevation: 65 m (213 ft)
- Highest elevation: 81 m (266 ft)
- Lowest elevation: 2 m (6.6 ft)
- Population (2023): 2,330
  - Density: 201/km^{2} (521/sq mi)
- Time zone: UTC+01:00 (CET)
  - Summer (DST): UTC+02:00 (CEST)
- INSEE/Postal code: 17164 /17100
- ^{1} French Land Register data, which excludes lakes, ponds, glaciers > 1 km^{2} (0.386 sq mi or 247 acres) and river estuaries.

Fontcouverte (French pronunciation: [fɔ̃kuvɛʁt]) is a commune in the Charente-Maritime department in southwestern France.

== Population ==
Historical population
Year	Pop.	±% p.a.
1968	719	—
1975	1,106	+6.35%
1982	1,706	+6.39%
1990	1,962	+1.76%
1999	1,892	−0.40%
2007	2,109	+1.37%
2012	2,333	+2.04%
2017	2,354	+0.18%
2023	2,330	−0.17%
Source: INSEE

== See also ==
- Communes of the Charente-Maritime department
