= Migron, Charente-Maritime =

Migron
- Commune
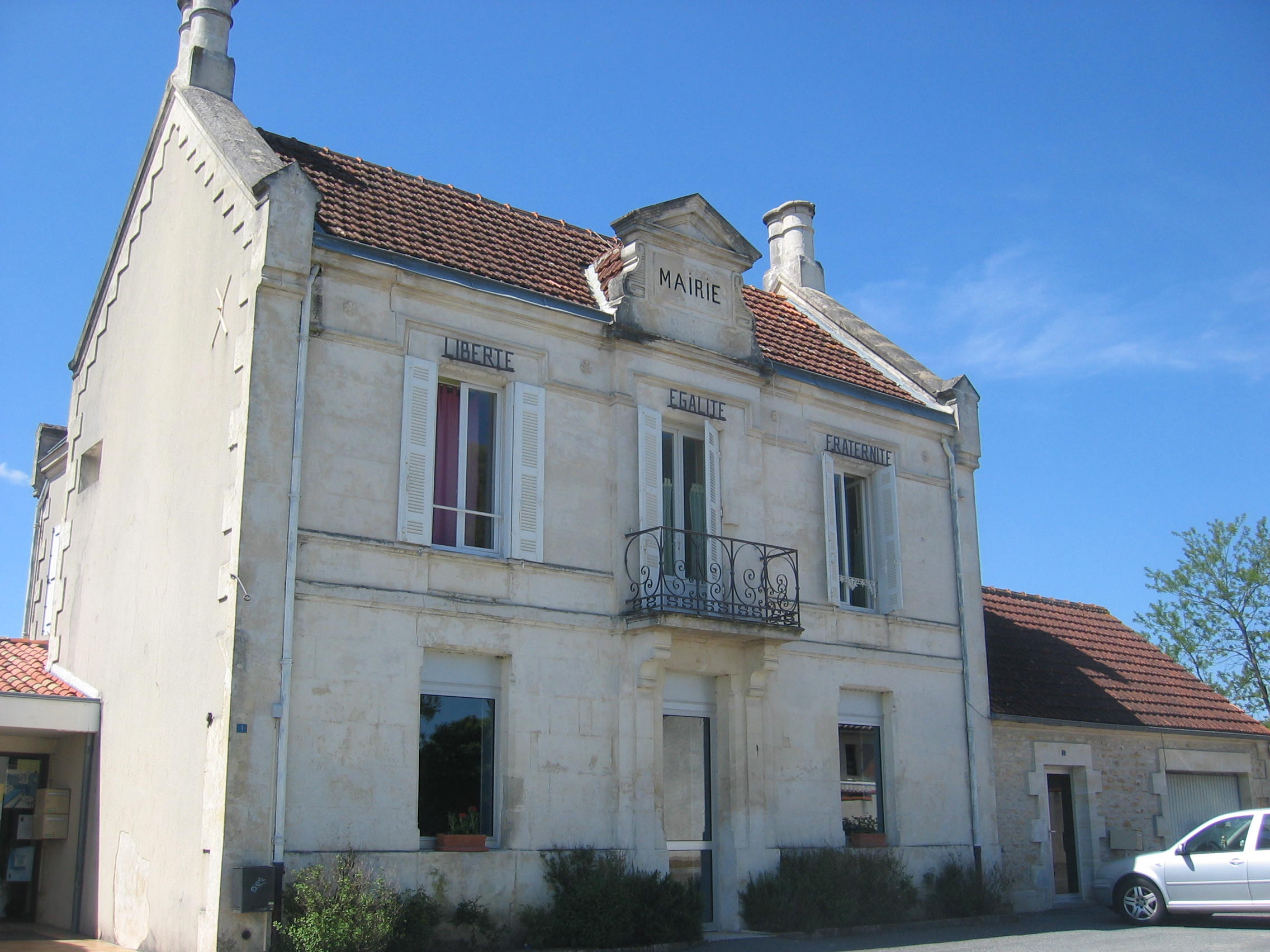
- Town hall
- Location of Migron
- Location within France Location within Nouvelle-Aquitaine
- Coordinates: 45°48′13″N 0°23′46″W
- Country: France
- Region: Nouvelle-Aquitaine
- Department: Charente-Maritime
- Arrondissement: Saintes
- Canton: Chaniers
- Intercommunality: CA Saintes

Government
  - Mayor (2020–2026): Agnès Pottier
- Area^{1}: 15.06 km^{2} (5.81 sq mi)
- Highest elevation: 31 m (102 ft)
- Lowest elevation: 11 m (36 ft)
- Population (2023): 694
  - Density: 46.1/km^{2} (119/sq mi)
- Time zone: UTC+01:00 (CET)
  - Summer (DST): UTC+02:00 (CEST)
- INSEE/Postal code: 17235 /17770
- ^{1} French Land Register data, which excludes lakes, ponds, glaciers > 1 km^{2} (0.386 sq mi or 247 acres) and river estuaries.

Migron (French pronunciation: [miɡʁɔ̃]) is a commune in the Charente-Maritime department in southwestern France.

== Population ==
Historical population
Year	Pop.	±% p.a.
1968	667	—
1975	750	+1.69%
1982	762	+0.23%
1990	740	−0.37%
1999	637	−1.65%
2007	627	−0.20%
2012	721	+2.83%
2017	724	+0.08%
2023	694	−0.70%
Source: INSEE

== See also ==
- Communes of the Charente-Maritime department
