= Écoyeux =

- Commune
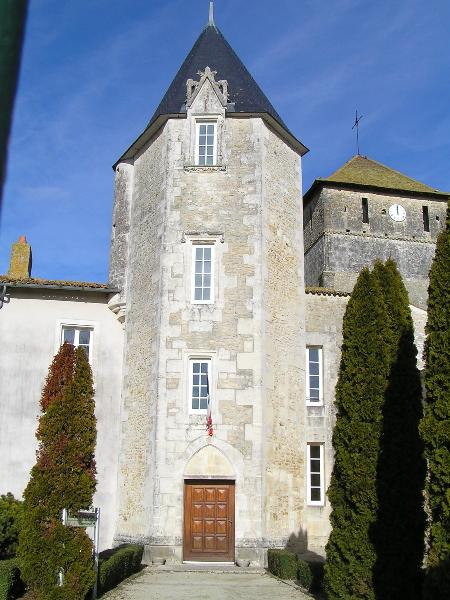
- Chateau, now the town hall

- Coat of arms
- Location of Écoyeux
- Location within France Location within Nouvelle-Aquitaine
- Coordinates: 45°49′23″N 0°30′21″W
- Country: France
- Region: Nouvelle-Aquitaine
- Department: Charente-Maritime
- Arrondissement: Saintes
- Canton: Chaniers
- Intercommunality: CA Saintes

Government
  - Mayor (2020–2026): Pascal Gillard
- Area^{1}: 20.34 km^{2} (7.85 sq mi)
- Highest elevation: 94 m (308 ft)
- Lowest elevation: 43 m (141 ft)
- Population (2023): 1,365
  - Density: 67.11/km^{2} (173.8/sq mi)
- Time zone: UTC+01:00 (CET)
  - Summer (DST): UTC+02:00 (CEST)
- INSEE/Postal code: 17147 /17770
- ^{1} French Land Register data, which excludes lakes, ponds, glaciers > 1 km^{2} (0.386 sq mi or 247 acres) and river estuaries.

Écoyeux (French pronunciation: [ekɔjø]) is a commune in the Charente-Maritime department in southwestern France.

== Population ==
Historical population
Year	Pop.	±% p.a.
1968	650	—
1975	623	−0.60%
1982	685	+1.36%
1990	804	+2.02%
1999	940	+1.75%
2007	1,152	+2.57%
2012	1,280	+2.13%
2017	1,354	+1.13%
2023	1,365	+0.13%
Source: INSEE

The inhabitants of Écoyeux are known as Écoziliens in French.

== See also ==
- Communes of the Charente-Maritime department
