= Chérac =

- Commune
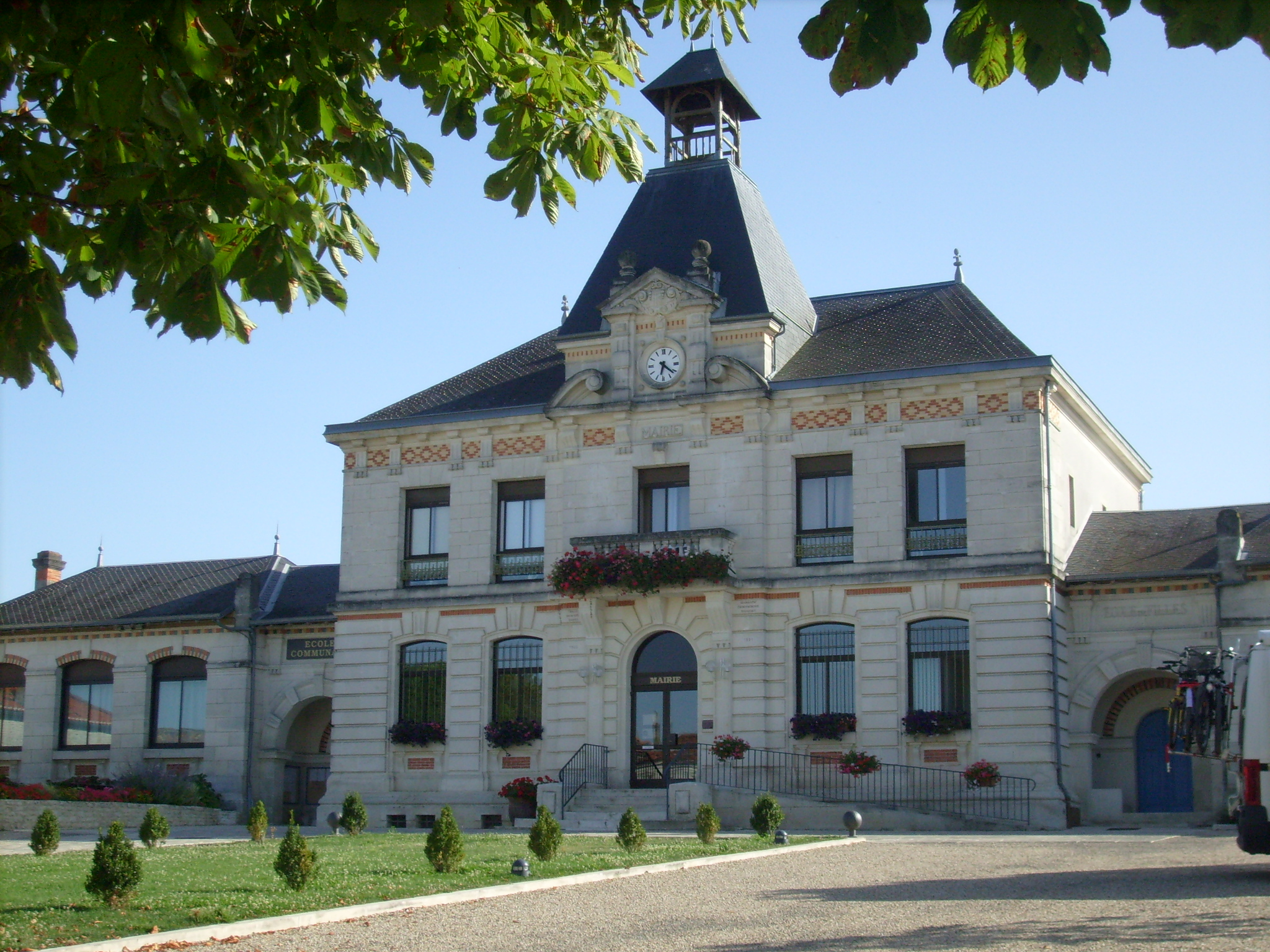
- Town hall

- Coat of arms
- Location of Chérac
- Location within France Location within Nouvelle-Aquitaine
- Coordinates: 45°42′15″N 0°26′11″W
- Country: France
- Region: Nouvelle-Aquitaine
- Department: Charente-Maritime
- Arrondissement: Saintes
- Canton: Chaniers
- Intercommunality: CA Saintes

Government
  - Mayor (2023–2026): Anne-Sophie Serra-Davisseau
- Area^{1}: 29.88 km^{2} (11.54 sq mi)
- Highest elevation: 95 m (312 ft)
- Lowest elevation: 2 m (6.6 ft)
- Population (2023): 1,130
  - Density: 37.8/km^{2} (97.9/sq mi)
- Time zone: UTC+01:00 (CET)
  - Summer (DST): UTC+02:00 (CEST)
- INSEE/Postal code: 17100 /17610
- ^{1} French Land Register data, which excludes lakes, ponds, glaciers > 1 km^{2} (0.386 sq mi or 247 acres) and river estuaries.

Chérac (French pronunciation: [ʃeʁak]) is a commune in the Charente-Maritime department in southwestern France.

== Population ==
Historical population
Year	Pop.	±% p.a.
1968	879	—
1975	813	−1.11%
1982	946	+2.19%
1990	1,045	+1.25%
1999	1,006	−0.42%
2007	1,030	+0.30%
2012	1,097	+1.27%
2017	1,104	+0.13%
2023	1,130	+0.39%
Source: INSEE

== See also ==
- Communes of the Charente-Maritime department
