= Pile (monument) =

Funerary monument

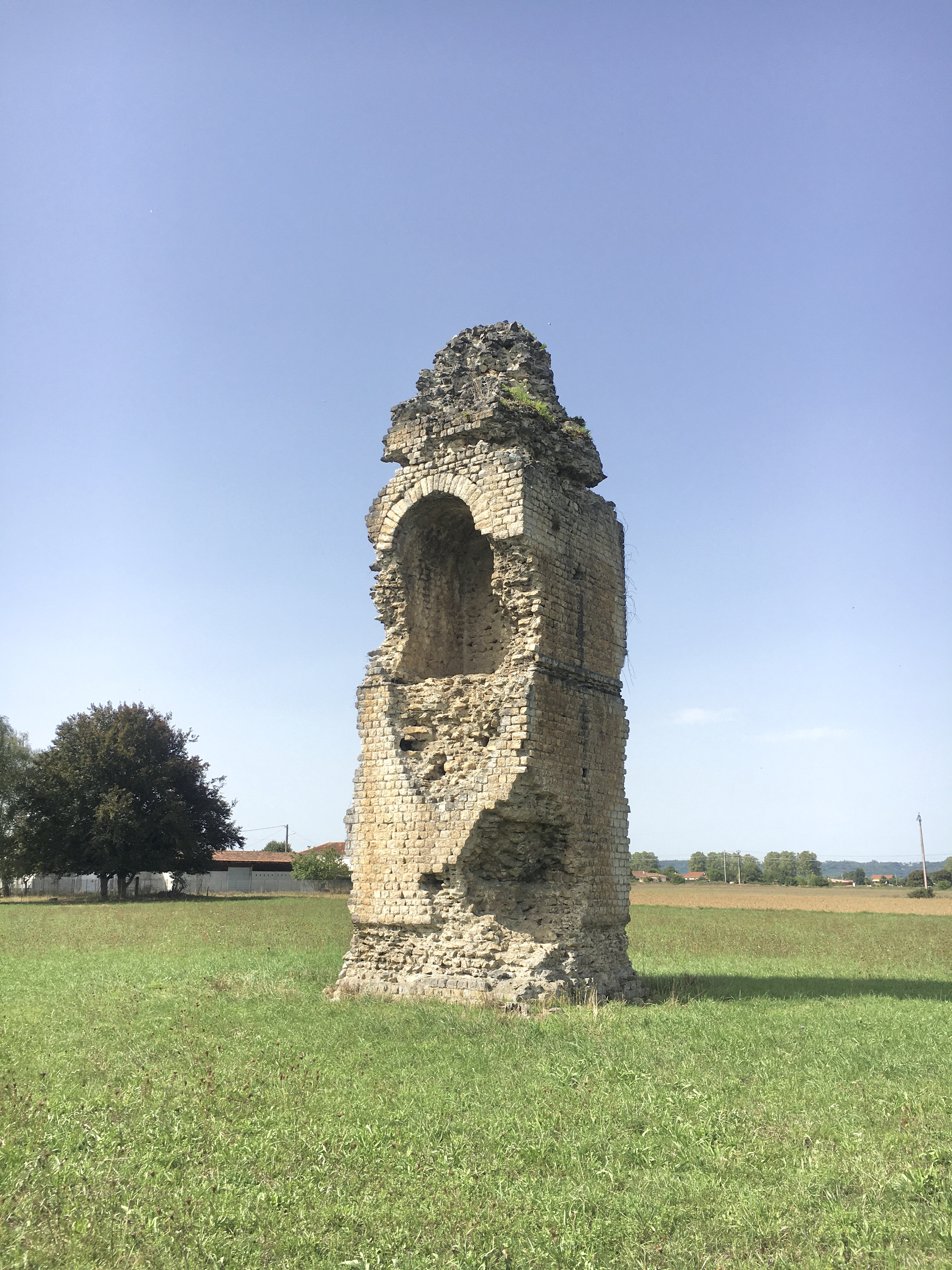
Labarthe-Rivière pile.

A pile, also known as a Roman pile, Gallo-Roman pile, or funerary pile, is a specific type of funerary monument in the archaeological vocabulary of France: elevated towers, typically square or rectangular in plan, with circular forms being less common. Their primary function was to serve as funerary structures within Roman Gaul.

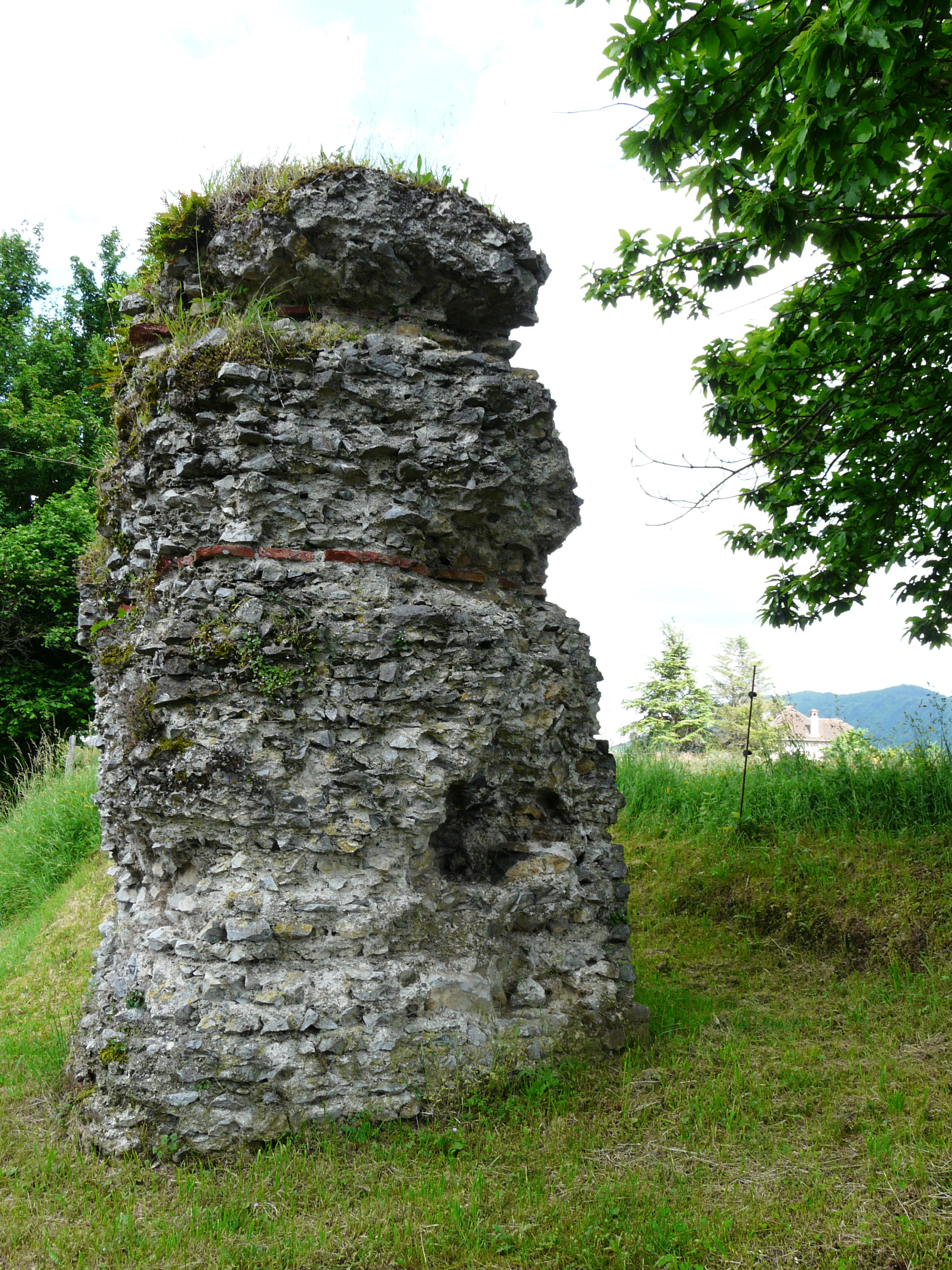
Valcabrère pile

Constructed between the 1st and 4th centuries AD, piles are found across a wide area of south-western Gaul, with a high concentration in the civitas of Elimberrum, around the present-day city of Auch, where they often bear a local name, such as tourasse or tourraque, derived from the Occitan word for "tower".

In the absence of in-depth site excavations, their function has long remained an enigma, but it is highly probable that they were funerary monuments dedicated to the memory of a local notable. Although they are not true mausoleums, since almost none have a burial chamber, they indicate the proximity of the burial itself, very often in an enclosure at the foot of the pile. Their ostentation also serves to demonstrate the wealth and power of the family of their patron, whose villa is frequently nearby.

Fourteen piles are protected as French historic monuments.

Monuments with a similar function also exist in other parts of the Roman Empire: Italy, where they may have originated, Hispania and Proconsular Africa. However, their morphology is often slightly different, and they are not called pile in the languages of the countries concerned.

== Terminology ==
The term pile, has come to be used in everyday French for any kind of massive construction resembling a pillar made up of superimposed structures, as noted by Camille Jullian in 1896. In Guyenne and Languedoc, the word tourrasse and, in Gascony, tourraque, are augmentations of the Occitan noun tour. The name peyrelongue (long stone), usually given to megaliths, is found in several places, with the forms pirelongue or pirelonge (Pirelonge tower in Saint-Romain-de-Benet, near Royan). In Saintonge, the noun fanal, which at first glance might suggest a signal tower, is in fact an evolution of the term fanum (temple). The toponym "Montjoie", often used to designate the site of a military memorial erected at a crossroads, is sometimes associated with a pile (the Gallo-Roman pile at Montjoie in Roquebrune, Gers). The pile d'Authon-Ébéon is sometimes called a "pyramid", a noun not systematically reserved for monuments with a geometrically pyramidal shape. In 1814, Alexandre Du Mège described the Lestelle pile, in Beauchalot, as an obelisk by analogy of form, without linking it to Egyptian culture, as he believed it was dedicated to Mercury.

Outside France, the more generic term mausoleum or mausoleum-tower is most often used, either because the monument's funerary character has remained evident through its good preservation, or because other functions have been attributed to it: milestone, commemorative monument, etc., which would have protected it from vandalism. An ancient mausolée, in the strict sense of the French term, is a "grandiose funerary monument [...] destined to receive the remains of a powerful person [...]"; this is not true for piles, the vast majority of which are not designed to serve as burial sites, and are more akin to a cenotaph.

== Historiography and characteristics ==
In 1898, Philippe Lauzun published his first inventory of piles in south-western France; he included all tower-shaped monuments, whatever their plan, whether or not they had niches or a burial chamber, and did not always conclude on their function, which was often unknown at the time.

Eight decades later, Pierre Audin undertook a study of the Cinq-Mars pile, but broadened the scope of his publication to include all turriform funerary monuments, in France and abroad, also considered "piles".

In the introduction to the book she published in 2016, devoted to the study of south-western piles, Pascale Clauss-Balty gives a much more restrictive definition of the pile, already outlined in 1993 by Pierre Sillières and Georges Soukiassian and based on the type most frequently encountered in south-western France. A pile is a massive, tower-shaped monument, square or rectangular in plan, with a niche in its upper part, originally housing a statue; this definition excludes monuments such as the Cinq-Mars pile or the Tour de Pirelonge (no niche), the Tourasse d'Aiguillon (circular plan) or the Tour de Mézolieux (hollow monument with a funerary chamber).

=== Generalities and layout ===
The typical pile plan is therefore that of a solid tower – excavations carried out during clandestine digs or by "treasure seekers" in the 19th century never revealed the slightest interior cavity – quadrangular in shape, generally breaking down into several structures whose plan dimensions become smaller as they rise. In practice, pile plans sometimes deviate from this pattern, but the differences seem to be regional; a certain homogeneity in construction is discernible within the same geographical area. La Tourasse in Aiguillon (Lot-et-Garonne) is the only circular building still standing, but its status as a funerary monument, long debated, now seems attested.

The height of a pile is difficult to establish due to the deterioration of surviving monuments; but it varies widely, usually between 8 and 15 metres. However, that of Cinq-Mars (Indre-et-Loire), the tallest, reaches 29.40 metres and that of Clergué (Haute-Garonne), probably the smallest, does not exceed 6 to 7 metres.

=== Description ===
==== Constituent parts ====
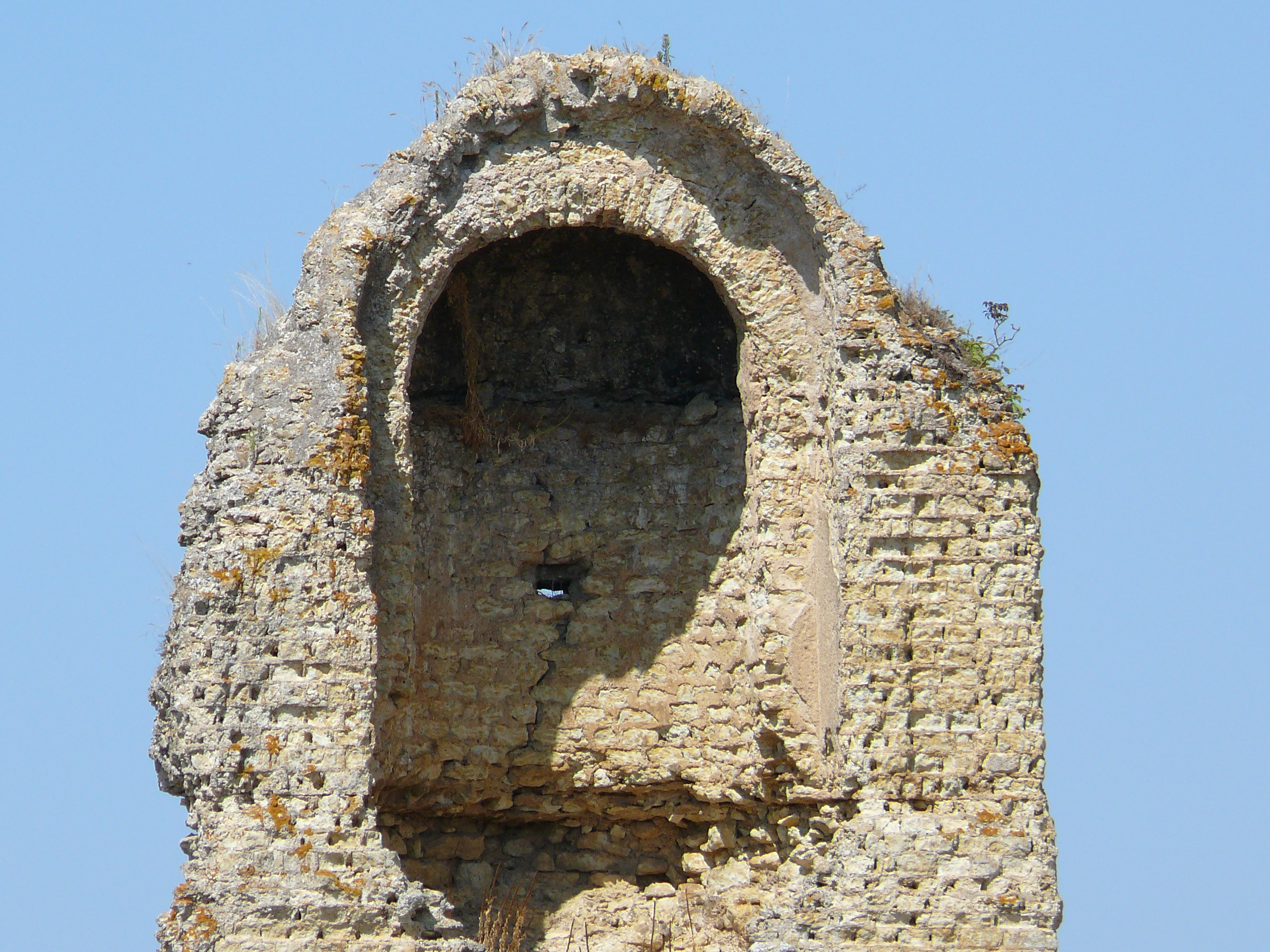
Niche, tourraque by Lacouture

The foundation, designed to anchor the monument in the ground, always protrudes well beyond the elevation and its depth, depending on the quality of the subsoil and the height of the pier, varies between 0.6 and 1.5 metres, except at Villelongue-d'Aude, where the pile is set directly on bedrock without the need for foundations. Generally devoid of facing, the foundations are made of cemented blocks.

The primary function of a plinth is to elevate the main structure, often referred to as the pier or upper storeys, enhancing its visibility. Typically, the plinth's facing material matches the upper storeys, but its design does not dictate the overall layout. Additionally, plinths are generally less decorated compared to the upper portions of the structure.

The podium is the first ostentatious floor of the building, and its importance is reflected in the quality of its cladding and the decorations (pilasters, cornices) it is sometimes provided with, at least for the largest piles. It is also on the main face of the podium that the inscription plaque bearing the dedication of pile is affixed.

The aedicula is the most important element of the stack. This is where, if present, the niche is installed to house a representation of the deceased whose memory is to be honored. The construction of the aedicula incorporates the same decorative elements as the podium. The niche is often barrel-vaulted, with a flat or rounded base, and its width is generally greater than its depth: it is not necessary to have a deep niche, since the statue it contains is to be installed at the entrance, in full view.

The question of the roof remains unresolved, as none of the piles have been preserved intact up to this level. Depending on the layout of the aedicula, any shape can be envisaged to allow water to run off properly: gable, hip or even pyramid, cone, with a mortar-sealed tile roof – the use of a wooden framework is difficult to envisage for reasons of longevity – or stone slabs held together by metal studs– this is the option chosen for the Pirelonge tower.

==== Masonry and decoration ====
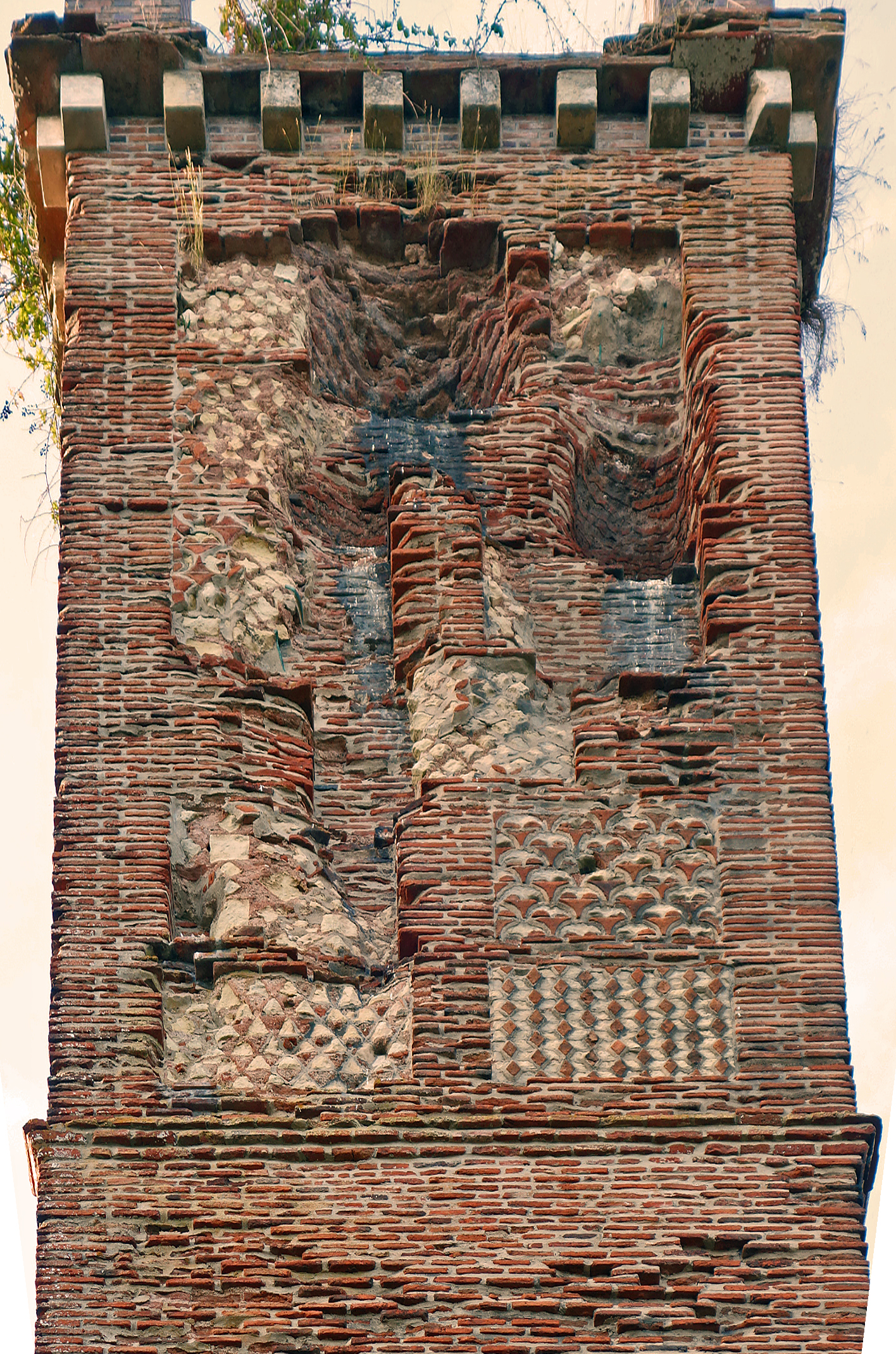
Cinq-Mars pile

The masonry consists of a core of opus caementicium (uncalibrated stone embedded in mortar) covered by a facing of opus vittatum (small, regularly cut limestone rubble), sometimes in large blocks (Saintonge piles) or bricks (Cinq-Mars piles). For the Roques pier, the use of Garonne pebbles for the foundations and core and brick for the facing is an adaptation to local building materials and techniques, also used in the nearby Gallo-Roman rampart of Toulouse, probably built at the same time.

For rubble stone facings, pilasters are generally carved into the facing stones, but stucco elements, which have disappeared over time, may also be used to complete the decoration. Brightly colored plaster was sometimes used to decorate the aedicula and its niche: vestiges of this can still be seen, for example, on the Roman pile at Luzenac. At Tourreilles, the pile is decorated with a play of different-colored rubble stones. The brick, limestone, and terracotta panels on the Cinq-Mars pile have no known equivalent, although a geometric motif in baked clay is thought to have been used on the lost pile at Chagnon.

=== Environment and layout ===
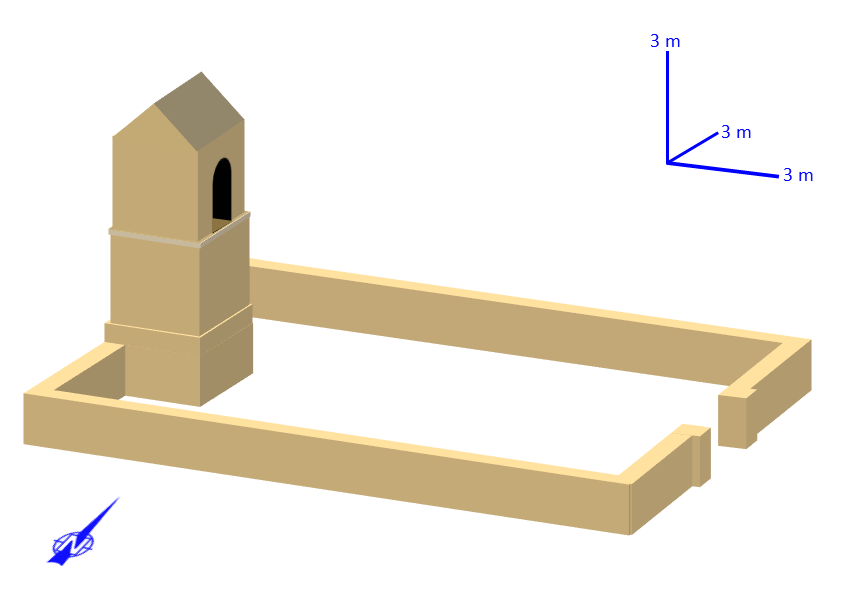
Illustration of one of the Mirande piles

Often the pile is accompanied by a square or rectangular funerary enclosure at its foot; the pile may be in the center of the enclosure, against one of its walls or even outside. This layout is undoubtedly more common than research shows: excavations are sometimes incomplete or old and poorly documented, and these enclosures go all the more unnoticed as some must have been made of perishable materials (palisades or hedges). At Mirande (piles de Betbèze), numerous burials were found in and around the enclosure, confirming the pile's role as a funerary monument. On this site, and no doubt on others, the pile is not isolated, but part of a larger necropolis whose boundaries are not defined.

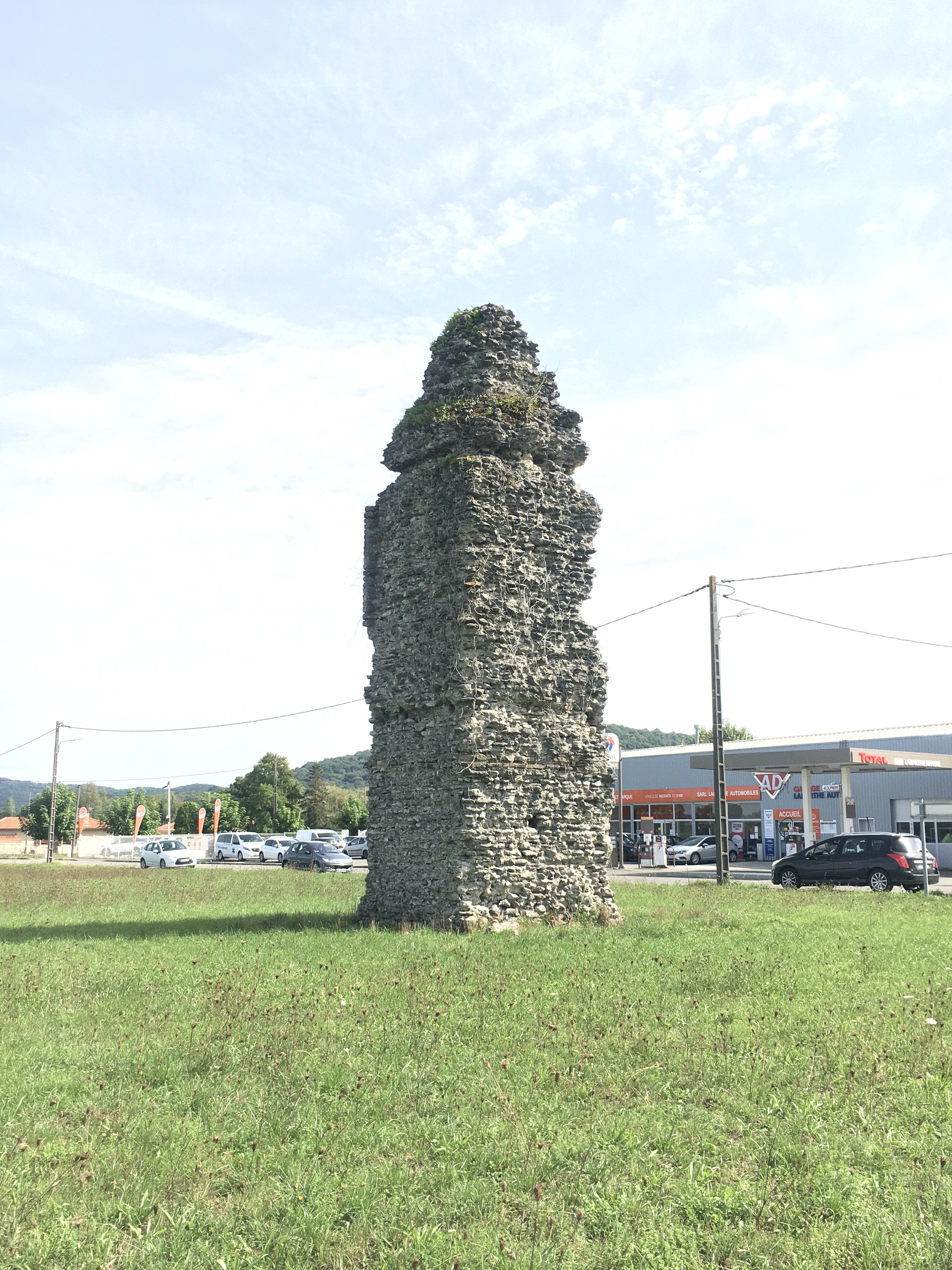
Labarthe-Rivière: the track runs along the road in the background.

In several cases, as at Ordan-Larroque, the discovery of a villa near the pile leads us to infer that it was the family of the villa's deceased owner who decided to erect the monument. Here again, insufficient data may lead us to underestimate the importance of the link between pile and habitat.

The presence of an ancient road, along which the pile is built, is reported at more than fifteen sites, and in these cases, the pile niche faces the road. This can be explained by the desire to show the pile to as many people as possible, including travellers passing along the thoroughfare. The latter may be a major thoroughfare (the route from Tolosa/Toulouse to Aquae Tarbellicae/Dax for piles in Haute-Garonne, or the route from Limonum/Poitiers to Burdigala/Bordeaux for piles in Saintonge) or a less-frequented road (the Clergué pile or the Chèvre d'Or tower).

Beyond these considerations, the emphasis on maximizing visibility makes it hard to establish a uniform design for piles. Their location, whether on a hill or in a valley, and their orientation relative to cardinal points seem less important than their overall prominence in the landscape. Similarly, proximity to the marked graves or associated dwellings appears less crucial than visibility.

== Function ==
Piles have long been described as "mysterious", as knowledge of their function has been lost because their exterior decoration has often disappeared. The first excavations, carried out in the 19th century, were often incomplete and conducted using techniques that could be improved. In 1896, in the introduction to his report on excavations at the Chagnon site (Charente-Maritime), Camille Jullian raised the "pile question", reviewing the various hypotheses on the function of these monuments.

=== Bollards ===
One hypothesis suggests piles functioned as milestones due to their presence along some Roman roads. However, even considering potential lost structures, their overall number seems insufficient for a systematic milestone system. Additionally, their large size appears excessive for a simple marker. Furthermore, some piles are located away from major roads. Undoubtedly, piles likely served a secondary function as visual landmarks within the landscape, akin to other prominent structures or trees.

They may also have marked the boundaries of certain territories, as in the case of Roques, where the pile served as a communal boundary marker in the late 18th and early 19th centuries, and their role as a sea wall in coastal areas has been mentioned.

=== Headlights ===
The assimilation of batteries to lighthouses, linked to the term fanal sometimes encountered, comes up against a technical impossibility. Unlike a dead man's lantern, which is hollow, allowing a light to be installed at the top, a pile is solid. Access to the top (7 to 24 metres) can only be achieved by an external system of stairs or ladders, the indispensable anchoring points of which on the monument's masonry have never been reported.

=== Temples ===
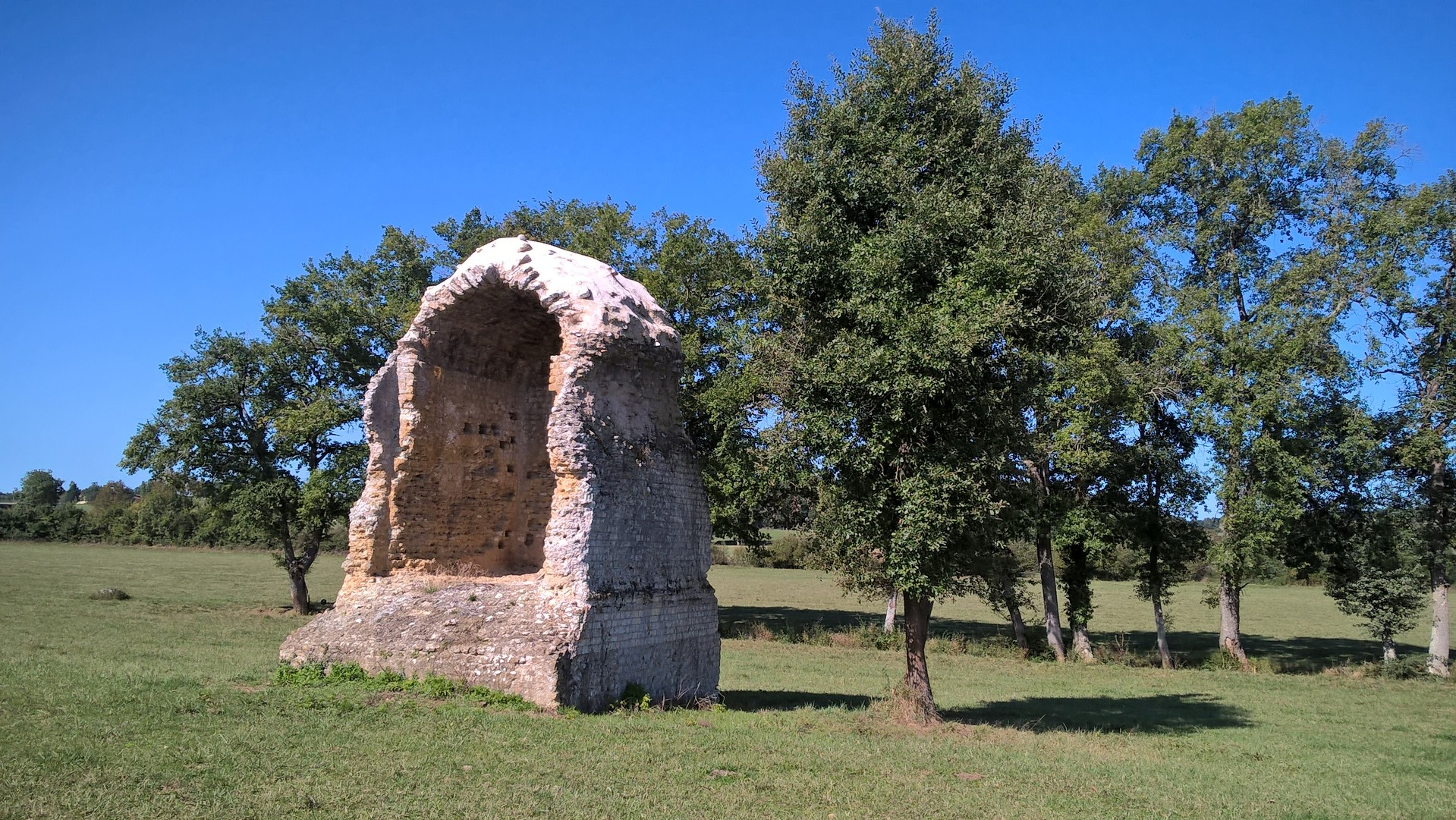
Gallo-Roman Montjoie pile

The widespread hypothesis that piles may have been temples dedicated to various gods, notably Mercury, protector of travellers, is reinforced by the position of several piles alongside ancient roads. Numerous statues (whole or fragmented) of deities and cult objects have been found in the vicinity of the piles, especially in the associated burial enclosures, but their nature is sometimes misinterpreted: at Labarthe-Rivière, a stone wing is certainly not from Mercury's helmet, but rather from the statue of a bird crowning the pier.

However, the Gers monument usually called the Gallo-Roman Montjoie pile deviates greatly from the usual layout of funerary piles, with its low height, wide niche open almost to ground level and hollowed out with alveoli, and could be the cella of a fanum-type temple.

=== Funerary monument ===
Today, it's generally accepted that piles are funerary monuments, intended to celebrate the memory of important figures. Burials took place in the enclosure frequently associated with the pile, which may be just one element of a larger necropolis, as at Betbèze (Mirande, Gers). When next to a villa, the pile was probably erected by the owners of the estate. Installed in a highly visible position, it goes beyond its commemorative role to also serve as a social marker showing the power and wealth of the sponsoring family, and as a cultural marker testifying to its Romanization.

This funerary function does not necessarily contradict the various previous hypotheses, as tombs were often built at crossroads, according to the very rules established by Roman surveyors, and their enclosures, often no longer in existence, contained cult objects and statues of divinities.

Funerary pillars have a very different function from votive pillars such as the Nautes pillar or the one at Yzeures-sur-Creuse. These latter monuments have no funerary vocation; they are dedicated to one or, in general, several gods.

== Chronology, evolution and archaeological studies ==
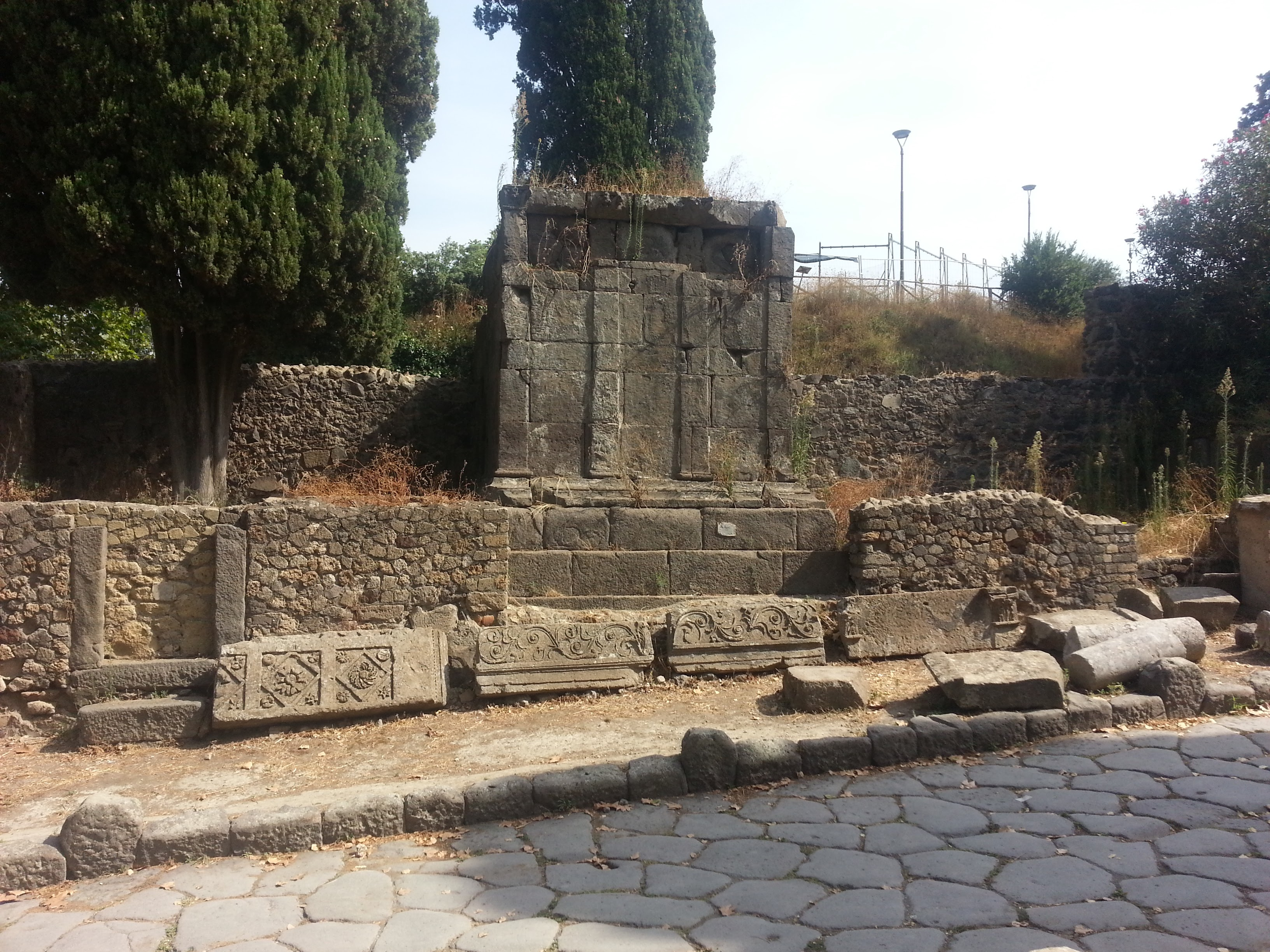
Tomb of the garlands (Pompeii)

The origin of Gaul's stacks may lie in massive funerary monuments in the Italian peninsula, of the type found at Pompeii, such as the Tomb of the Garlands dating from the 1st century BC. Their principle and architecture (several storeys, statue niche, cladding-covered block core) would have spread to other Roman provinces, including Gaul and Germania, adapted to the materials, requirements, and know-how of local architects. This dissemination may have been carried out by veterans of the Roman army who had obtained estates in the provinces, or by notables from these same provinces on a trip to the Italian peninsula.

Excavations have revealed archaeological material associated with the piles within their attached burial enclosures. This evidence confirms that these monuments were constructed in the second half of the 1st century AD and fell out of use by the end of the 4th century.

After Christianization, as they could not be converted into chapels or churches due to their massive nature, the piles were used as stone quarries; if the core was left intact, the facing, composed of regularly cut stones, was carefully salvaged, but the precise date of this operation is not known. Some, like the Vielle-Adour pile (Hautes-Pyrénées), had to make way for a railroad line, road or other development at a later date.

This was followed by a long period during which most of the piles, stripped of their facing and ornamentation and reduced to masonry blocks, were no longer recognizable, and their original function disappeared from the collective memory. What's more, they were only studied at a late stage and only partially, which multiplied and reinforced the legends about their purpose. After very occasional excavations, often carried out according to the methodology in use in the 19th century, it wasn't until the 1960s that a general survey of southwestern piles was carried out. Many French sites also benefited from programmed or rescue excavations. In 2005, excavations at the Cinq-Mars pile uncovered an enclosure and the remains of a building, confirming the pile's funerary vocation.

Number of batteries by French department

== Geographical distribution in France ==
Piles are found throughout much of Gaul, with a clear predominance in south-western France, but similar monuments have also been reported in other French regions: the mausoleum at the Faverolles archaeological site (Haute-Marne), in a square enclosure beside a road, is also a commemorative monument, that of a wealthy Lingon.

=== Centre–Val de Loire region ===
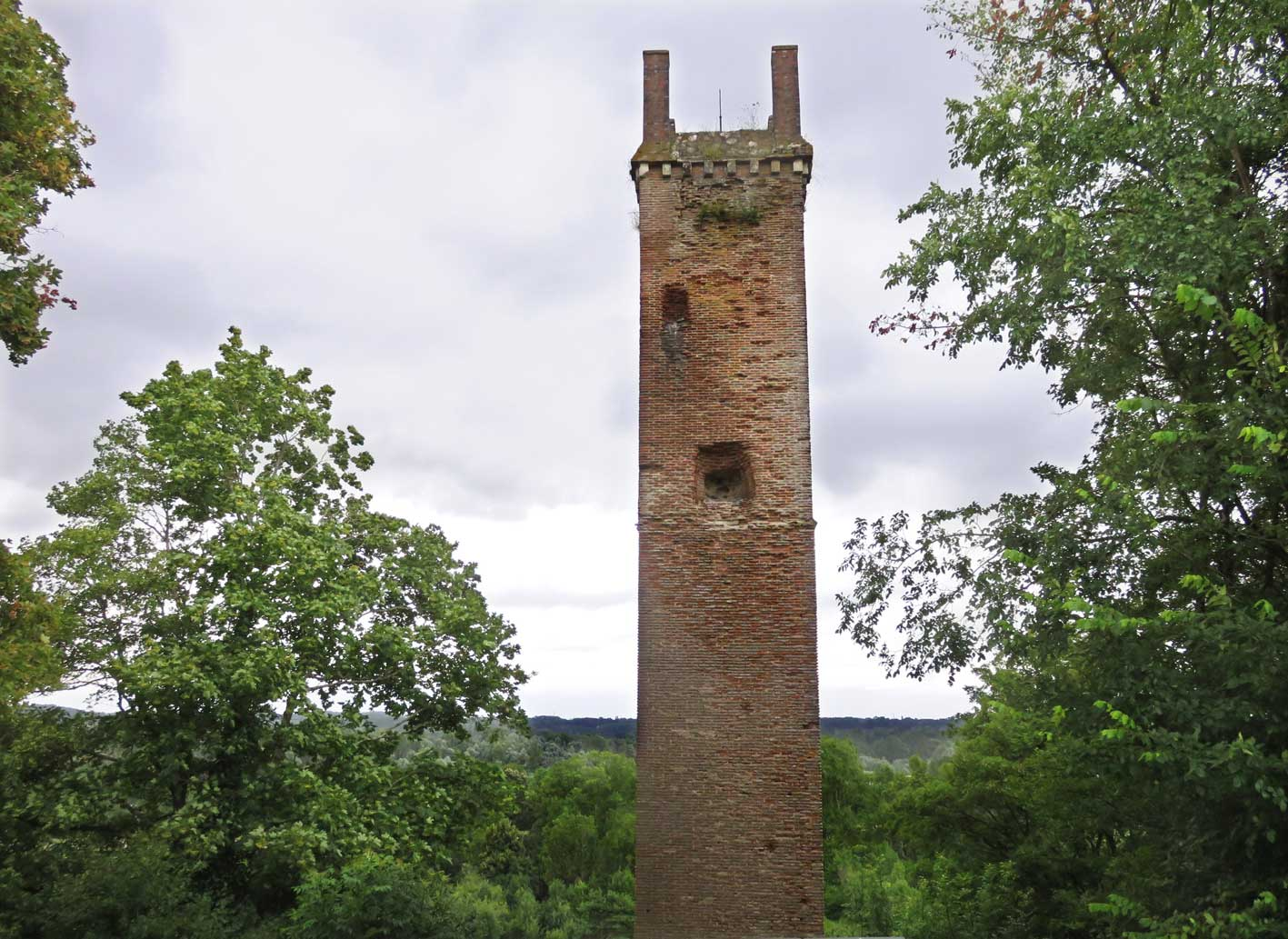
Cinq-Mars pile

The two funerary monuments in Indre-et-Loire differ from the usual pile layout in the nature of their facing: brick and monumental decoration for the Cinq-Mars pile, and large-scale stonework for the Faon stone.

Excavations carried out in 2018 at La Chapelle-Vendômoise (Loir-et-Cher) uncovered a structure consisting of a 7.2 square metres enclosure accompanied by a masonry mass of about 2 square metres. Its funerary function is attested, but not its exact nature; it could, however, be a small pile associated with an enclosure and close to a villa.

=== Nouvelle-Aquitaine region ===
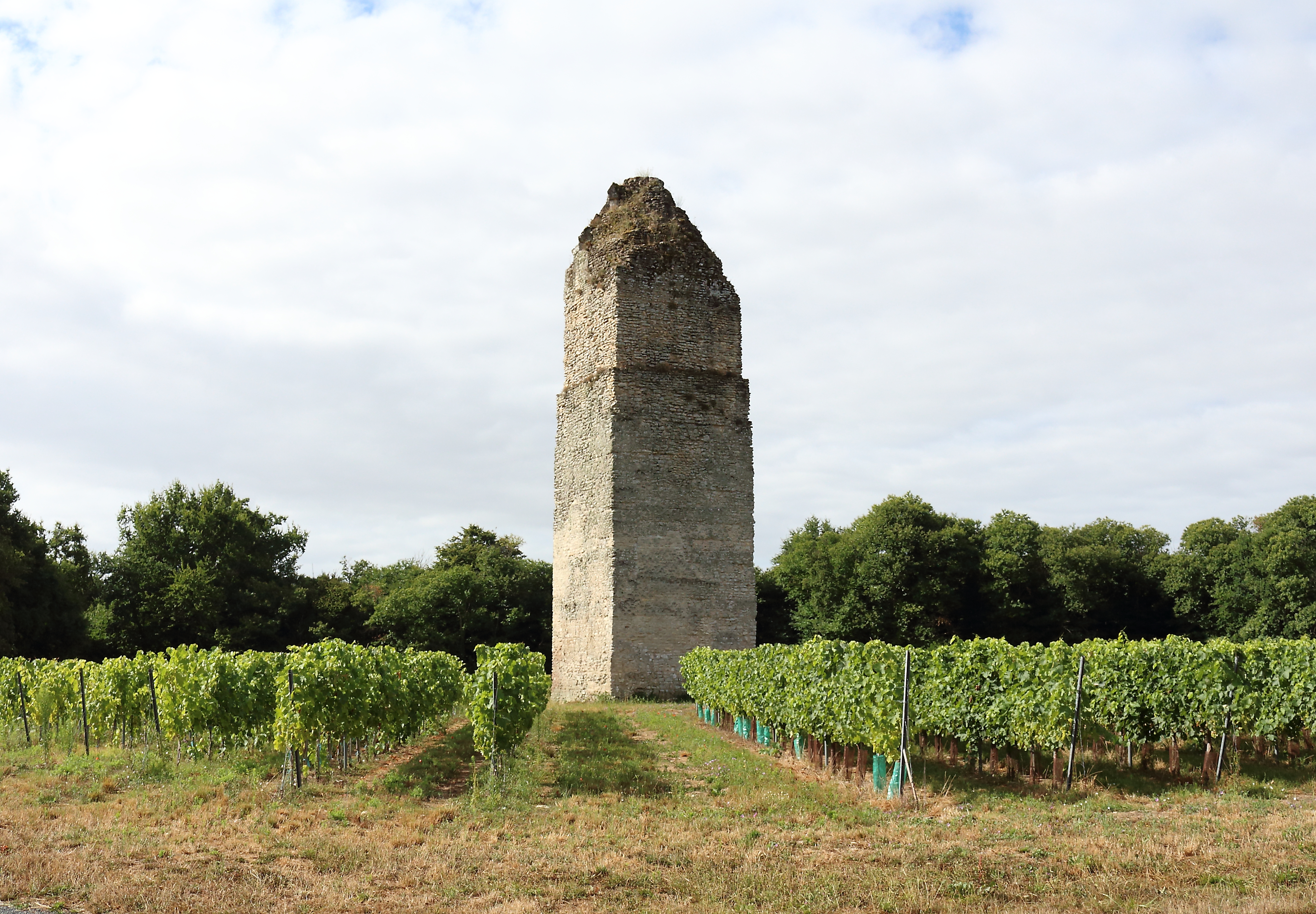
Pirelonge pile

Three piles have been identified in the Charente-Maritime region, two of which are still standing: the Pirelonge tower and the Authon-Ébéon pyramid. All three appear to have been faced in large-scale stonework, and at least two are associated with a burial enclosure.

In the Lot-et-Garonne region, Tourasse d'Aiguillon stands out for its circular plan. The Peyrelongue tower retains its small-scale cladding and cul-de-four vaulted niche.

The Lescar pile in Pyrénées-Atlantiques, destroyed in 1847, was associated with a funerary enclosure and was certainly part of a nearby villa.

=== Occitanie region ===
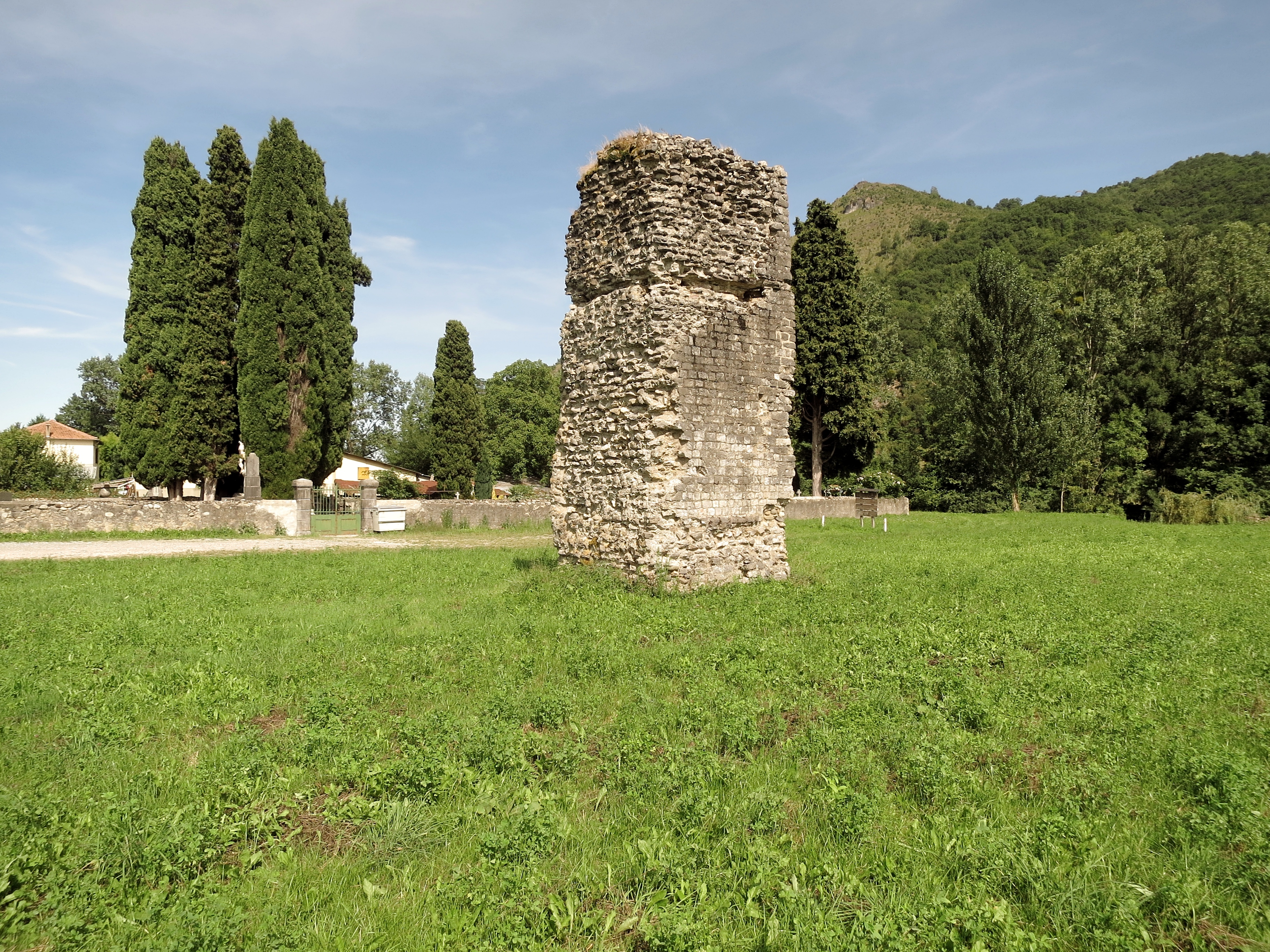
Luzenac pile

The only known pile in the Hautes-Pyrénées was at Vielle-Adour. Demolished in the mid-19th century during the construction of a railway line, it measured three metres on each side and was around six metres high.

The Roman pile at Luzenac, the only known monument of this type in Ariège, still preserves vestiges of the coloured plaster with which it was faced.

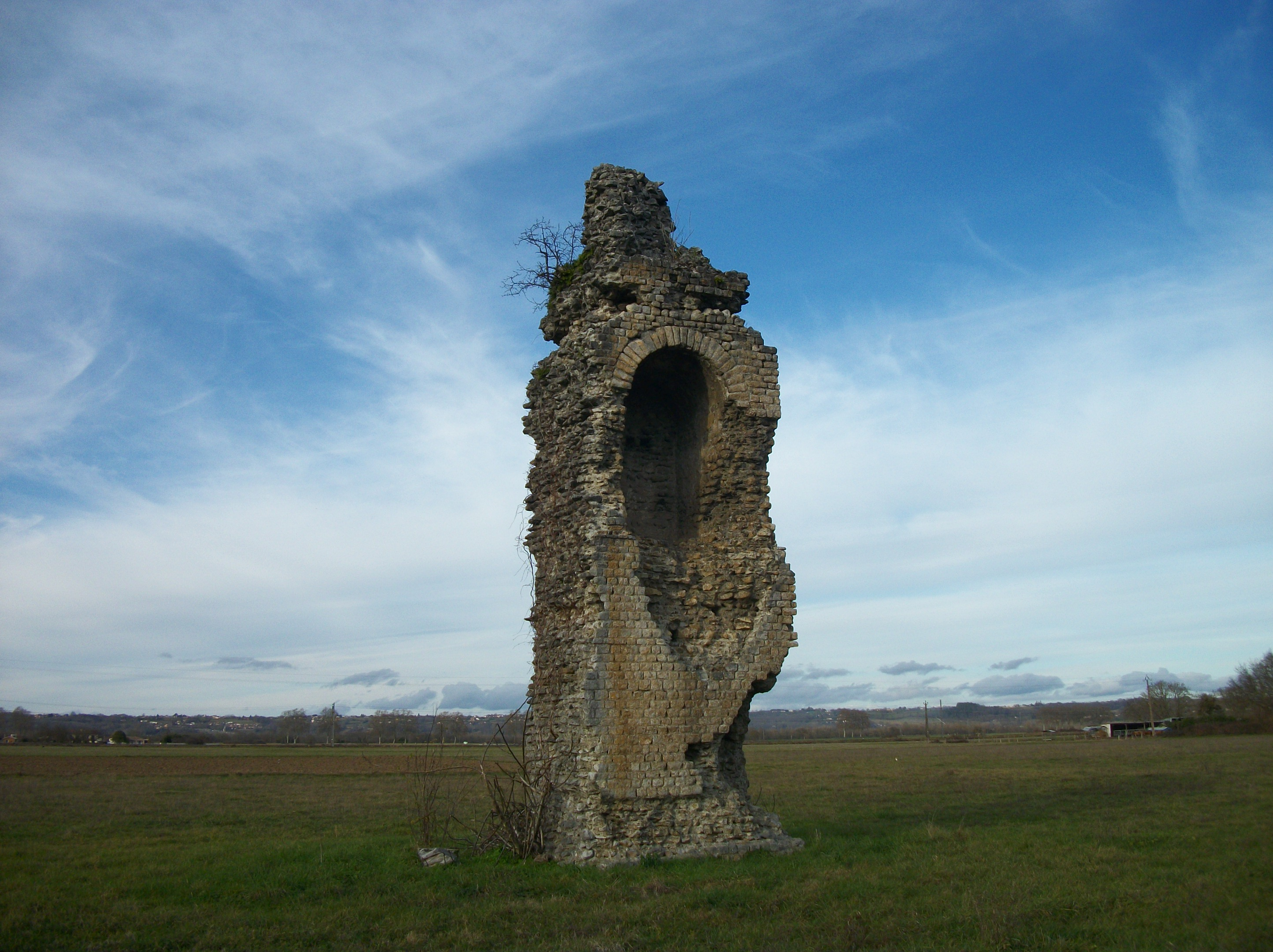
Labarthe-Rivière pile

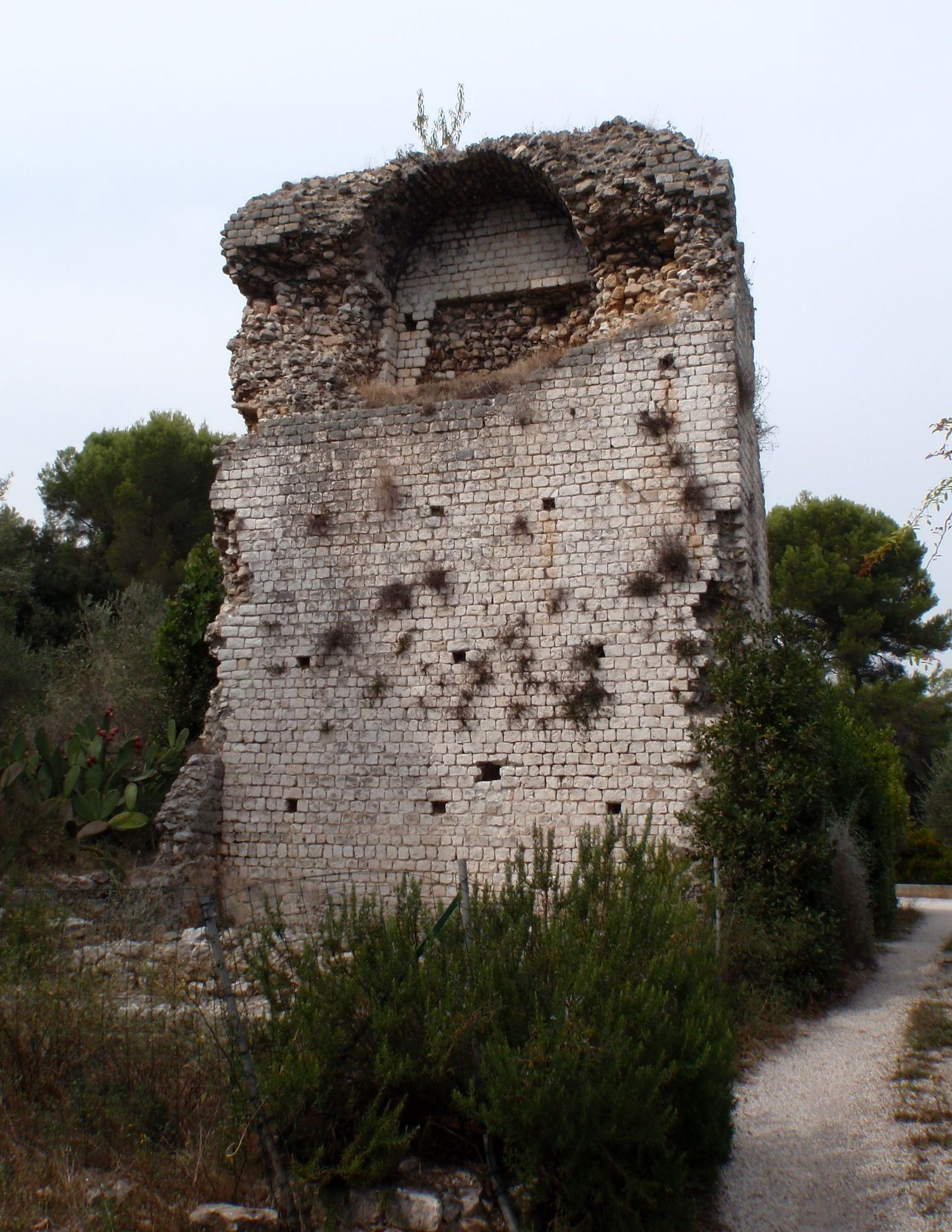
Chèvre d'Or tower

The Gallo-Roman funerary monuments identified in the Aude region – the tower at Mézolieux and the Gallo-Roman funerary monument at Villelongue-d'Aude, as well as a third that has disappeared at Roubia – have the particularity, not found elsewhere, of having a loge or funerary chamber below their niche, designed to house burials, probably in the form of urns.

In the Haute-Garonne region, the road between Toulouse and Dax was lined with at least five piles, three of which are still visible; two others were further away, always close to a thoroughfare.

The Gers department is the richest in terms of funerary piles: twelve have been recorded, eight of which are still standing, in highly variable states of preservation. All appear to have had a niche. The function of the Montjoie pile in Roquebrunis not precisely known, but it may have been the cella of a fanum.

=== Provence–Alpes–Côte d'Azur region ===
The Chèvre d'Or tower in Biot, the only one known in the region, is a long way from the geographical area where piles are most common; however, its function as a funerary monument is unquestionable: it is associated with an enclosure and stands on the edge of an ancient road.

== Similar types of funerary monument elsewhere in the Roman world ==
Funerary monuments whose function and principle can be compared to those of the piles found in France can also be found in other parts of the Roman Empire. "Treviary pillars" such as the one at Igel, although decorated differently, are also solid monuments dedicated to the memory of the deceased. They do not include a burial chamber, but are frequently associated with an enclosure and close to a villa.

In Italy, at Albenga and Pompeii for example, stacks are very similar to those found in Gaul, although the facing is generally in opus incertum, enhanced with brick or in large units. The Scipio Tower in Tarragona is based on the same principle; the facing is also in large-scale brickwork.

In Tunisia, a homogeneous group was built in the low steppe region (Kasserine, Haouch Taacha necropolis) and, although no in-depth excavation seems to have taken place, the morphology and function of these piles dating from the first or second centuries are very similar to those of French buildings. The same type of funerary monument can also be found in Libya (Ghirza, Tripolitania province).

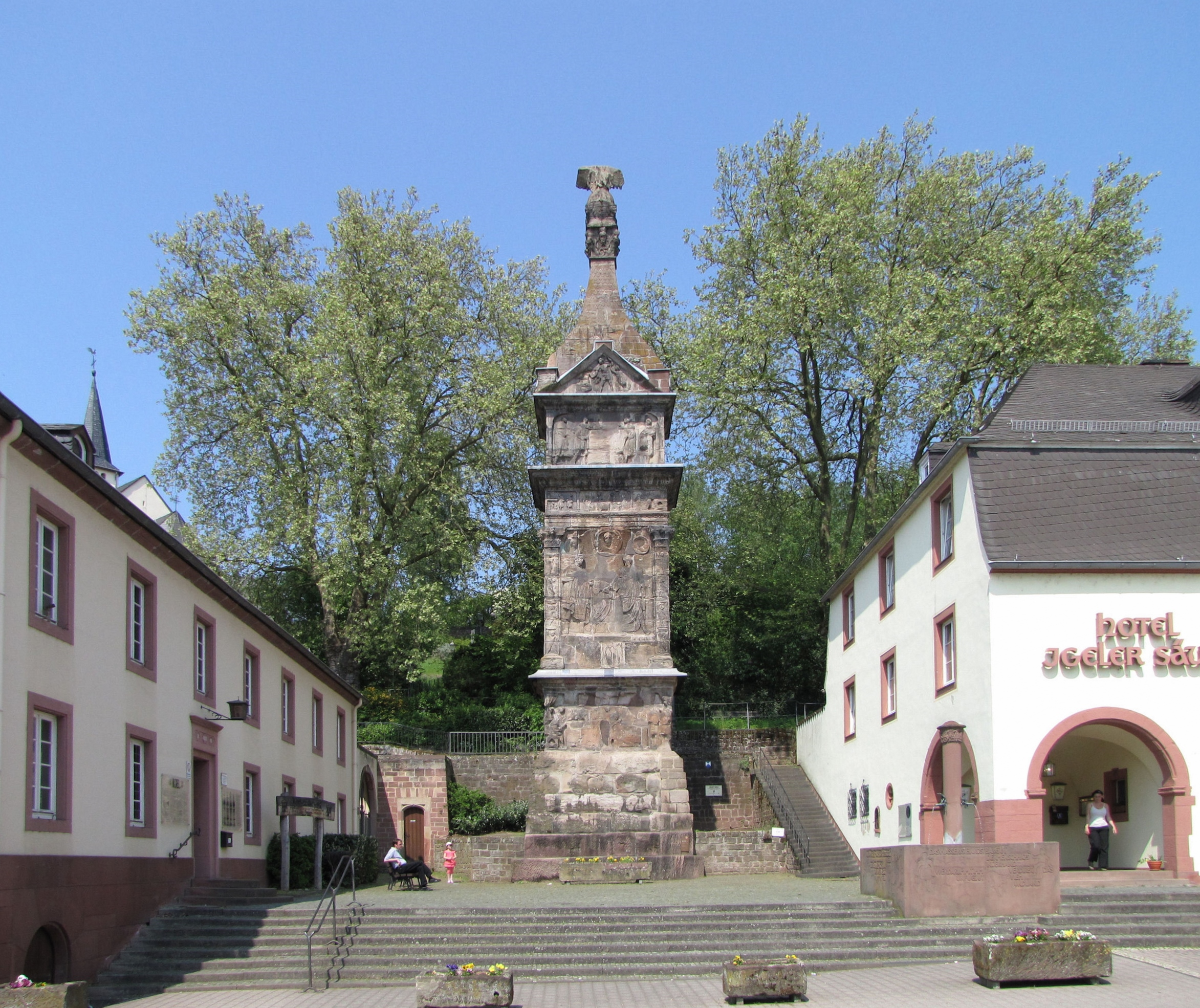
Mausoleum of Igel

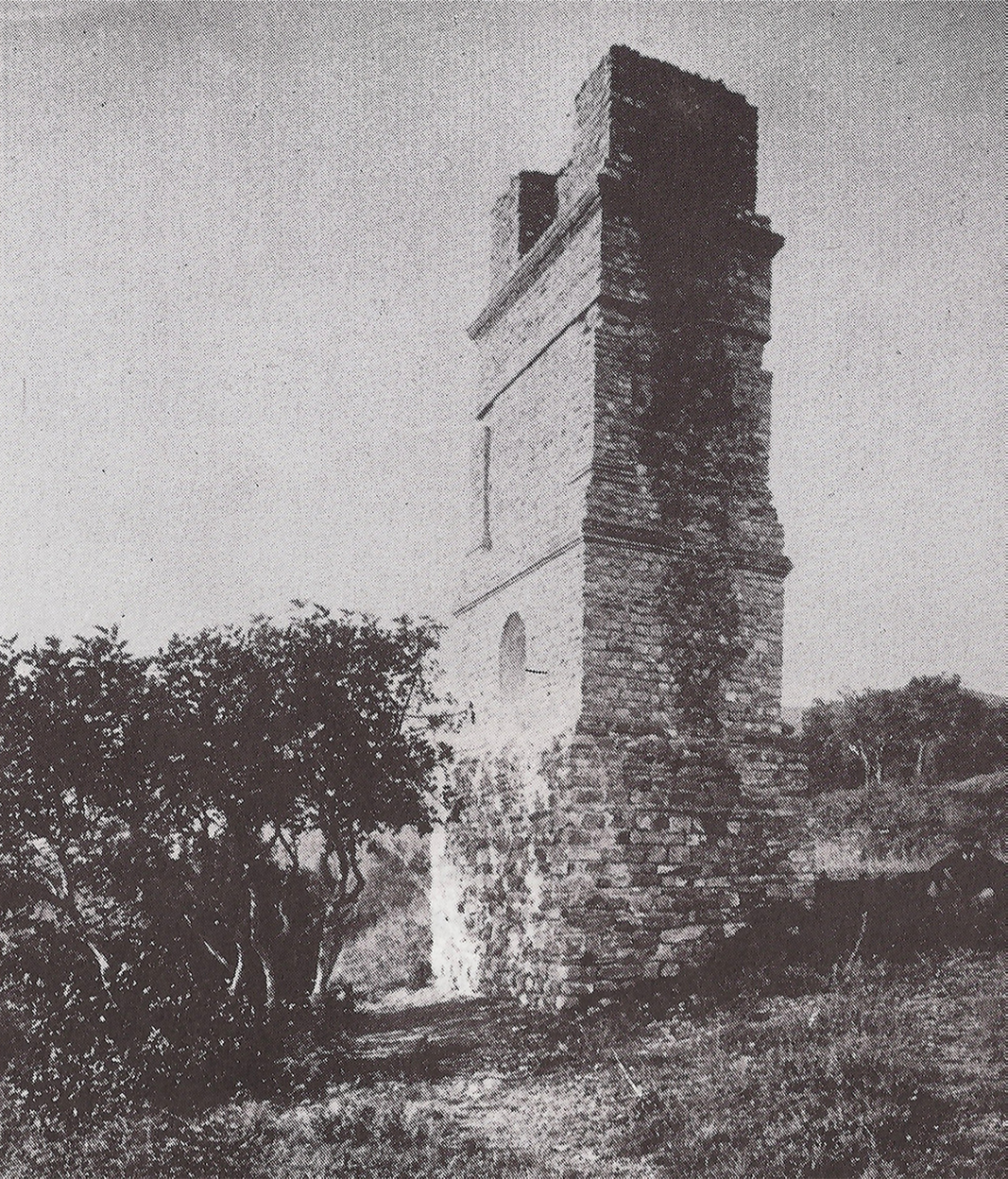
Albenga pillar rebuilt

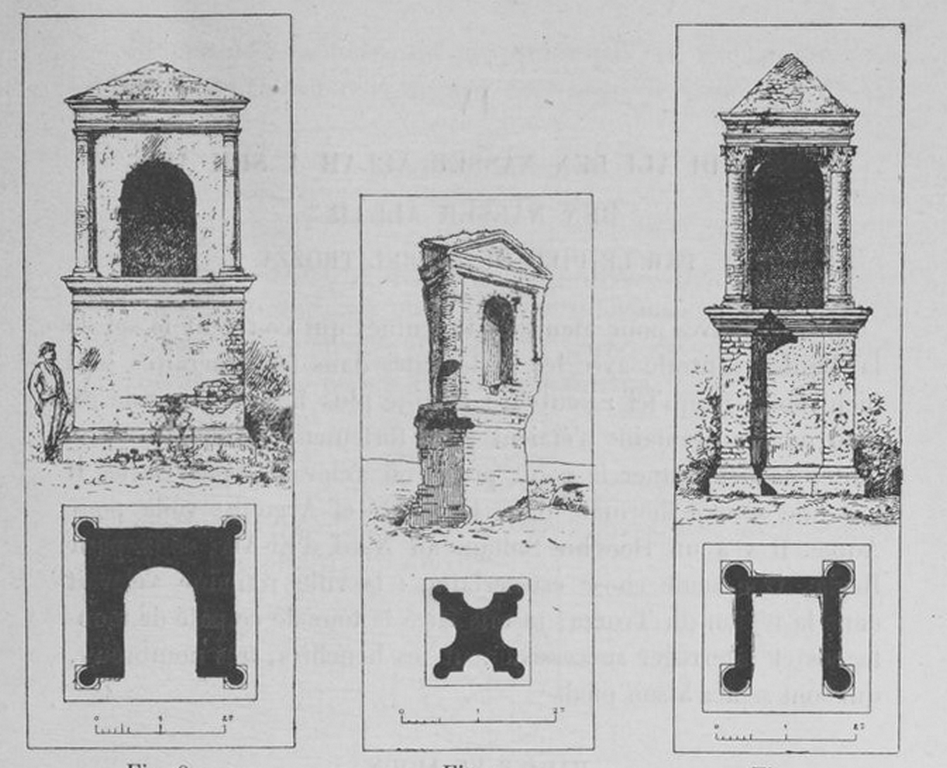
Haouch Taacha necropolis

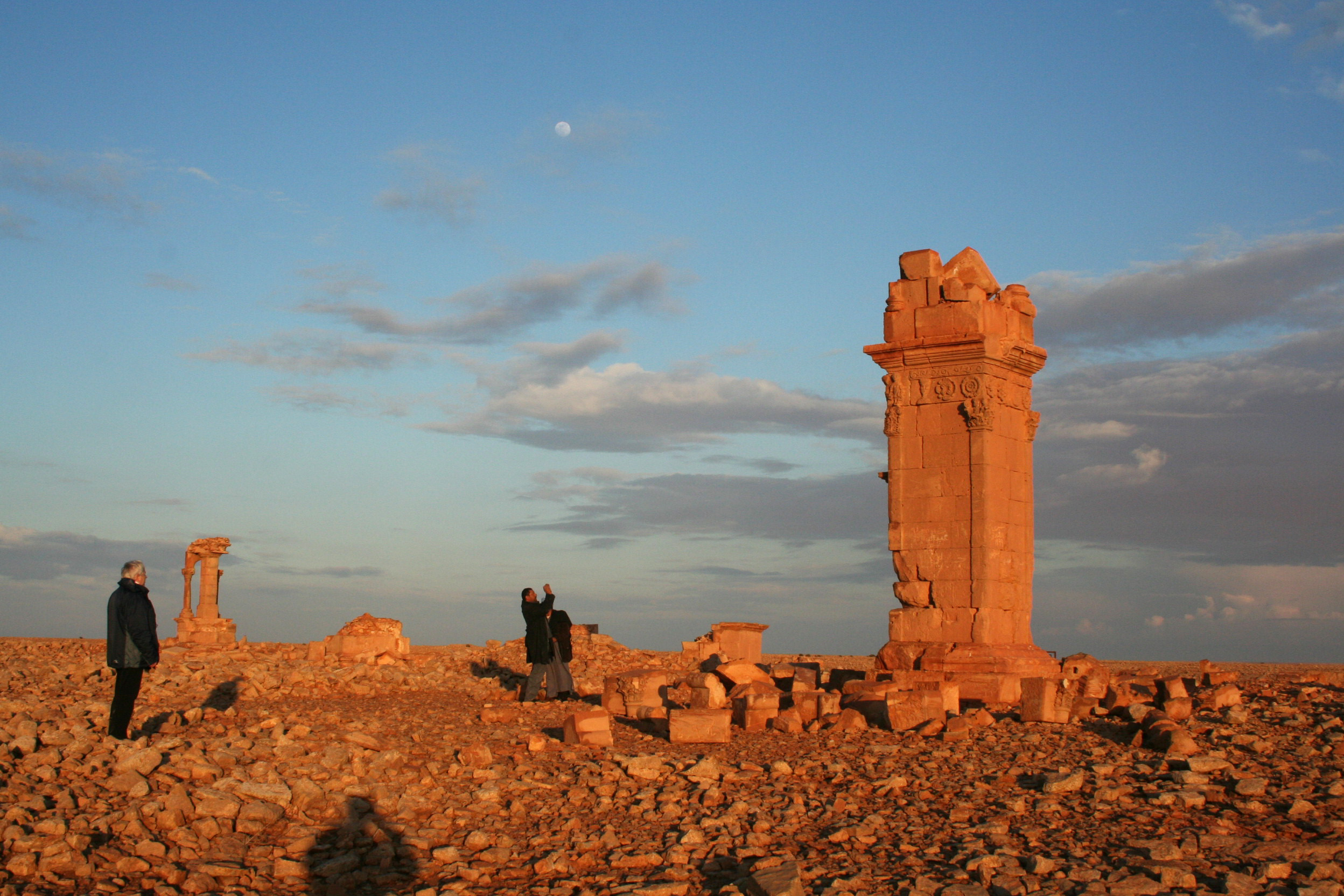
Ghirza mausoleums

== See also ==
- Roman funerary practices
- Tour de Pirelonge

== Bibliography ==
- Audin, Pierre (1977). "La pile de Cinq-Mars et les piles gallo-romaines". Annales de Bretagne et des pays de l'Ouest (in French). 84 (2) (84th ed.): 351–367. doi:10.3406/abpo.1977.2883.
- Clauss-Balty, Pascale (2016). Les piles funéraires gallo-romaines du Sud-Ouest de la France. Archaia III (in French). Presses universitaires de Pau et des Pays de l'Adour. ISBN 978-2-3531-1063-6.
- Jullian, Camille. La question des piles et les fouilles de Chagnon (Saintonge) (in French) (7th ed.). Mémoires de la société nationale des antiquaires de France.
- Lauzun, Philippe (1898). "Inventaire général des piles gallo-romaines du sud-ouest de la France et plus particulièrement du département du Gers". Bulletin Monumental (in French). 63 (63rd ed.): 5–68. doi:10.3406/bulmo.1898.11144.
