= Tour de Pirelonge =

Gallo-Roman stone tower

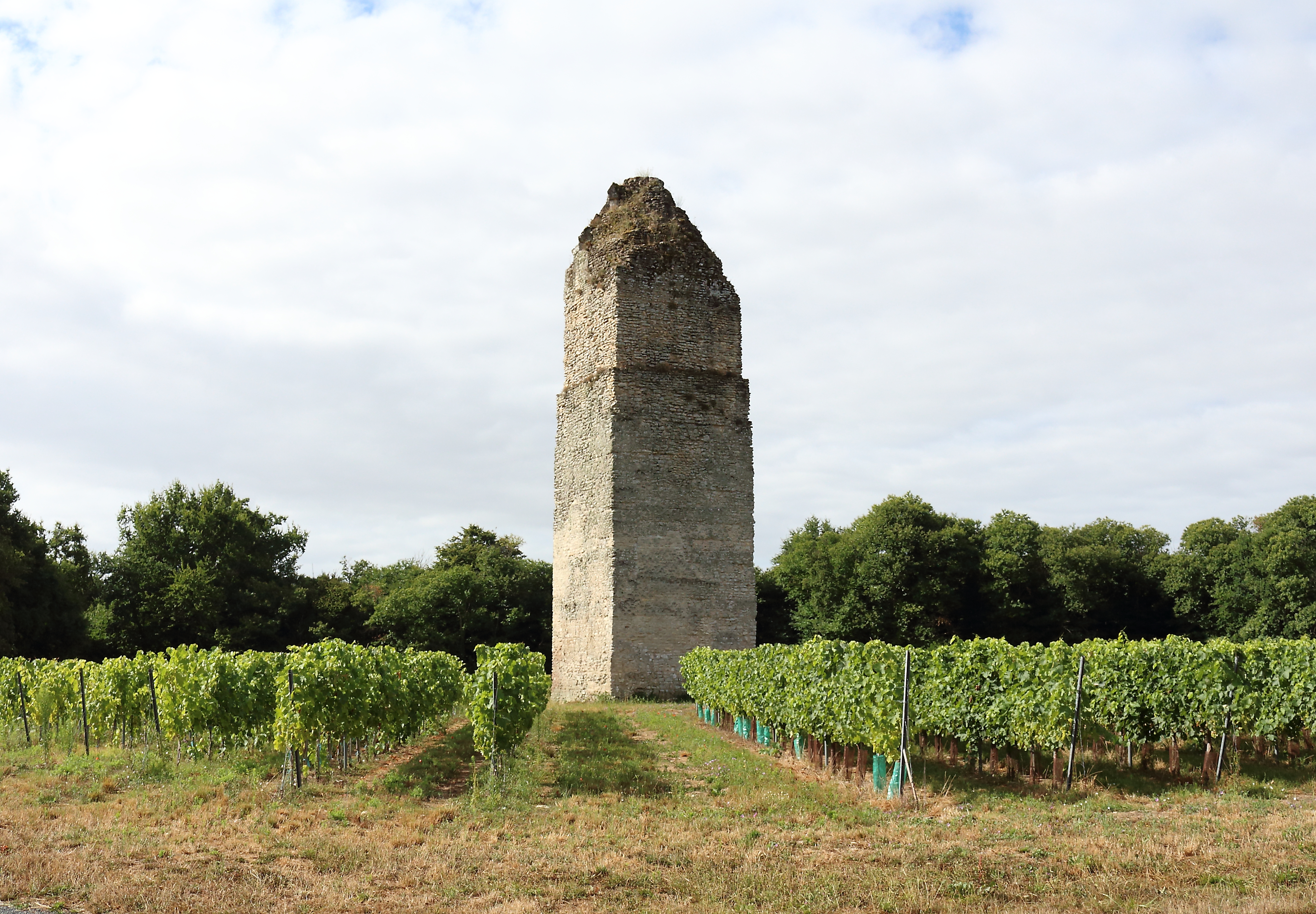
- The monument in its environment
- Interactive map of Tour de Pirelonge
- Location: Saint-Romain-de-Benet, Charente-Maritime
- Coordinates: 45°40′49″N 0°50′59″W
- Type: Pile
- Classified as MH (1840)

The Tour de Pirelonge is a Gallo-Roman stone tower, also referred to as a funerary pile, situated to the east of Saujon in the commune of Saint-Romain-de-Benet (Charente-Maritime, France).

This monument, likely constructed during the Roman Empire along the ancient road connecting Saintes to Bordeaux, is a cenotaph in the form of a solid column, standing 24 meters high with a square base and a conical cap.

The structure has been relatively well-preserved and has been designated as a historical monument since the initial list was published in 1840.

== Location ==
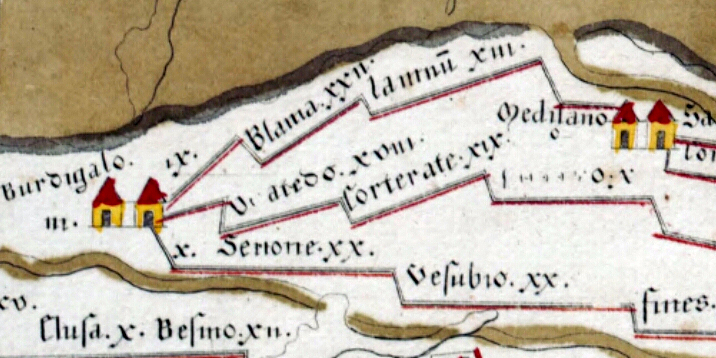
Itinerary from Saintes (Mediolano) to Bordeaux (Burdigalo) on the Peutinger table

The tower is situated along the Roman road that connected Mediolanum Santonum (Saintes) to Burdigala (Bordeaux), as referenced in the Peutinger Table and the Antonine Itinerary.

In modern topography, the tower is located just over a kilometer south of Saint-Romain-de-Benet. Positioned at an altitude of 37 meters, it sits at the summit of a rise, surrounded by vineyards and woodlands, with no nearby structures.

The toponym "Pirelonge" is believed to derive from the Greek term for "long stone" or "tall stone," a name often applied to funerary piles.

== History ==
Dating the tower is challenging, but the foundations include reused elements from an earlier monument, such as a 1st-century AD capital. This suggests that the tower was constructed at a later period, likely under the Antonine emperors, similar to the dating for the Pile d'Aumagne.

As documented by Claude Masse in 1715, the initial written references depict a remarkably well-preserved monument, exhibiting a condition nearly identical to that observed in the 20th century.

The Tour de Pirelonge was designated a historical monument in the 1840 list and subsequently underwent restoration in 1989.

== Description ==
Charente-Maritime funeral stacks

The tower has a height of 24 meters and a width of approximately 6 meters at its base, tapering slightly at two points along its ascent. Each of its faces is oriented towards a cardinal point. Constructed of rubble stone bonded with mortar, it culminates in a well-preserved conical crown, suggesting that the entire structure was similarly faced with large ashlar blocks, although this facing has since disappeared.

Despite the absence of a discernible niche, the excavations conducted by "treasure hunters" on the east and south sides of the monument were sealed during the 1989 restoration. Many surveys have demonstrated the absence of an interior chamber, indicating that, akin to other analogous monuments, the tower is solid. In the late 19th century, excavations identified the remnants of an enclosure on three of its sides, and burials were discovered within this perimeter.

This tower is comparable to the Pile d'Ebéon in the commune of Authon-Ébéon, which is much less well-preserved, or to the Pile d'Aumagne, whose elevation has disappeared. All three are located in the civitas of the Santons and close to the major ancient road from Poitiers to Bordeaux. After the Pile de Cinq-Mars, which stands at 29.40 meters, the Tour de Pirelonge represents the second-tallest preserved monument of this type in Gaul.

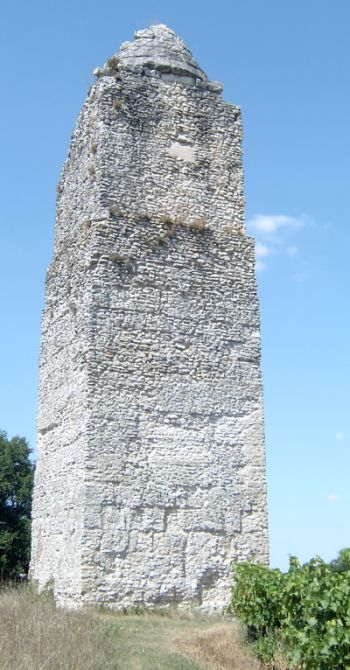
General view

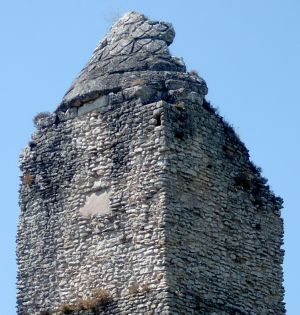
Summit

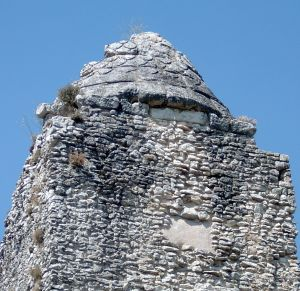
Summit

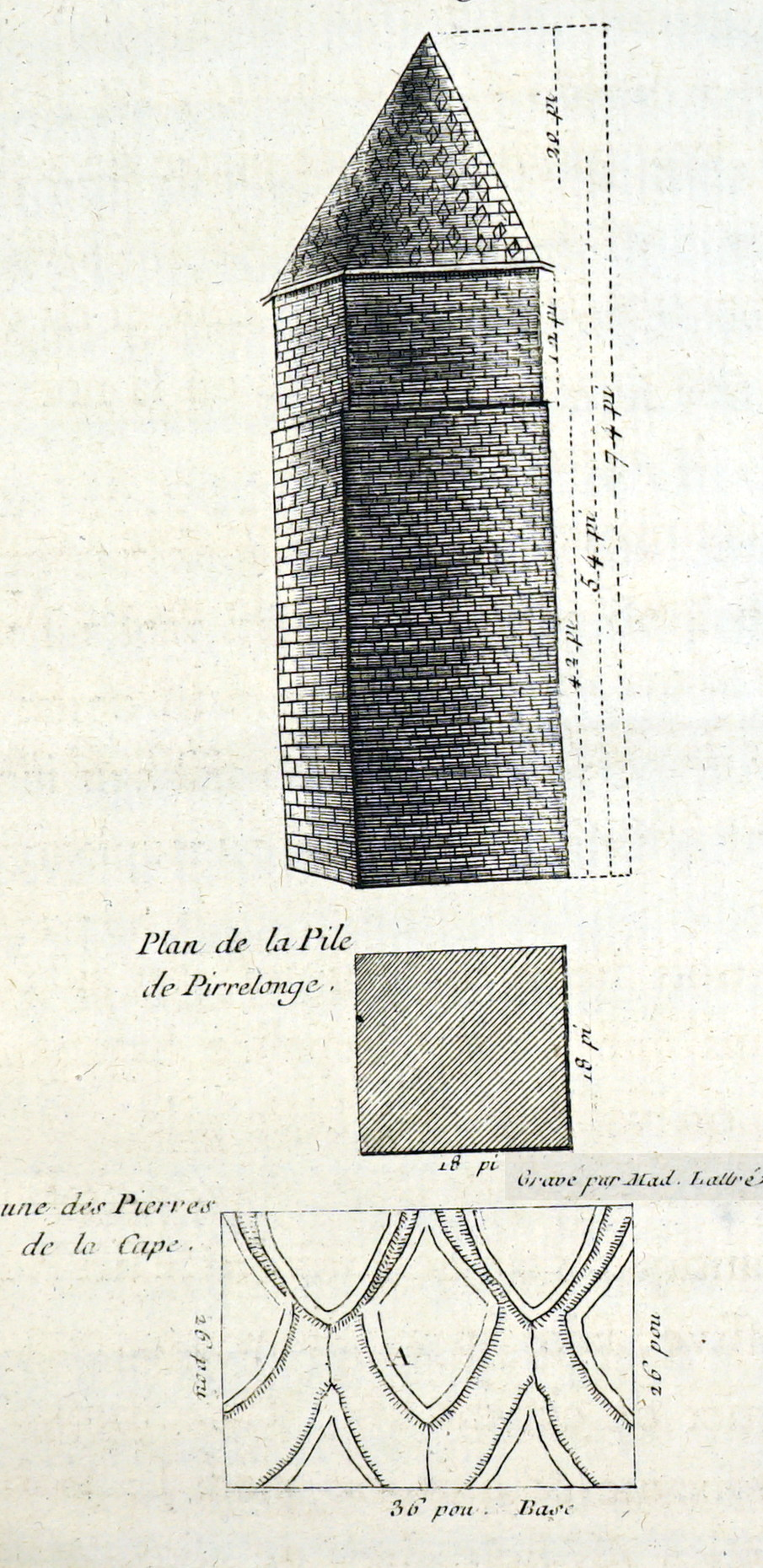
Drawing by La Sauvagère (1770)

== Function ==
The precise function of the structure remained uncertain for some time. In the late 19th century, it was postulated to be either a geographical marker, a landmark, or a mausoleum.

The convergence of knowledge about the Tour de Pirelonge and other similar structures in France now allows for a clearer understanding of its function. It can be inferred with a high degree of certainty that it is a cenotaph dedicated to an individual of considerable importance, as is the case with the majority of other identified piles in France. This is particularly indicated by a funerary enclosure at its base.

== See also ==
- List of French historic monuments protected in 1840

== Bibliography ==
- Jullian, Camille (1896). "La question des piles et les fouilles de Chagnon (Saintonge)". Mémoires de la société nationale des antiquaires de France (in French). 7 (6): 39–62. Archived from the original on August 30, 2024.
- Lièvre, Auguste-François (1888). Les fana ou vernemets (dits piles romaines) du sud-ouest de la Gaule (in French). Paris: E. Thorin.
- Masse, Claude (1715). Mémoire géographique sur partie du Bas-Poitou, d'Aulnis et Saintonge (in French). Paris.
- Maurin, Louis (1999). La Charente-Maritime. Carte archéologique de la Gaule (in French). Vol. 17/1. Paris: Académie des inscriptions et belles-lettres. ISBN 978-2-8775-4061-2.
- Sillières, Pierre; Soukiassian, Georges (1993). "Les piles funéraires gallo-romaines du sud-ouest de la France : état des recherches". Monde des morts, monde des vivants en Gaule rurale, Actes du Colloque ARCHEA/AGER (Orléans, 7-9 février 1992). Supplément (in French). Tours: Fédération pour l'édition de la Revue archéologique du Centre de la France. pp. 299–306. ISBN 2-9507320-1-1. Archived from the original on July 16, 2024.
