= Authon-Ébéon pyramid =

Gallo-Roman stone tower

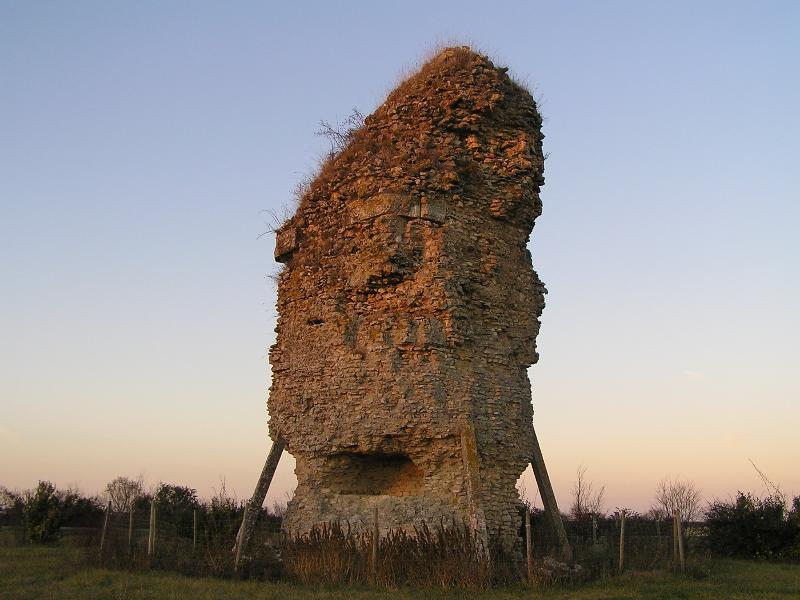
- View of east side
- Interactive map of Authon-Ébéon pyramid
- Location: Authon-Ébéon, Charente-Maritime
- Coordinates: 45°51′40″N 0°27′23″W
- Type: Pile
- MH listed (1840)

The Authon-Ébéon pyramid is a solid tower, or "pile", situated in Authon-Ébéon along departmental road D 129 in the Charente-Maritime region of France.

The severely deteriorated remnants of this presumed funerary structure are safeguarded as historical monuments, having been cataloged in 1840.

== Location ==
Charent-Maritime funeral piles.

The tower is situated along the Roman road that connects Saintes and Poitiers, which roughly aligns with the modern D 129.

A comparable structure, the Pirelonge Tower in Saint-Romain-de-Benet on a more southern segment of the same route (from Saintes to Bordeaux), is more well-preserved. The Gallo-Roman pile at Chagnon, situated a few kilometers north of Ébéon and still along the ancient route, has entirely disappeared.

The frequent placement of these monuments by roadsides for visibility indicates that they were subsequently utilized as geographic markers, serving as distinctive elements within the landscape.

== History ==
The monument is also known as the "Ébéon beacon", with the term deriving from the Latin fānum, meaning "temple." It has been postulated that the monument served as a landmark for travelers on the nearby Roman road or even as a marker for ocean navigators; however, these hypotheses have been refuted. It is more probable that the monument is the funerary monument of a wealthy local landowner.

At an unknown date, the facing stones of the pile were almost entirely removed, thereby exposing the core structure.

In the 1840 list, the beacon was officially designated a historical monument.

Since the late 1930s, the monument has been supported by a system of struts. In 2020, a local association and officials voiced concerns regarding the monument's condition and stability.

== Description ==
In the 21st century, the pile is a solid masonry block measuring 6 meters per side, aligned with the four cardinal directions, and 16 meters high. It is probable that the pile was originally clad with a stone facing and may have been topped by a pyramid or cone.

It seems probable that the monument was initially situated at the center of a square enclosure measuring 75 meters on each side.

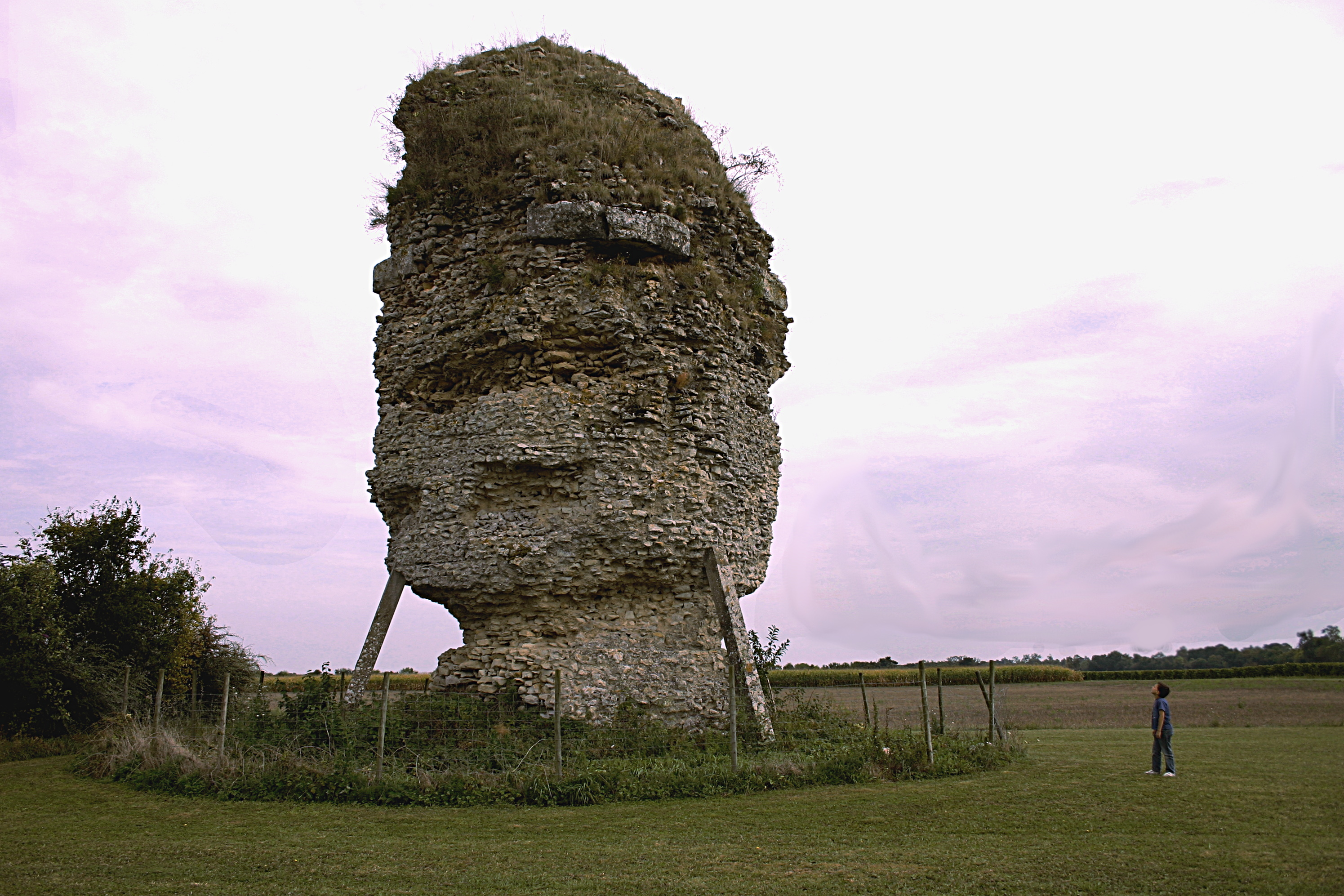
View of south side

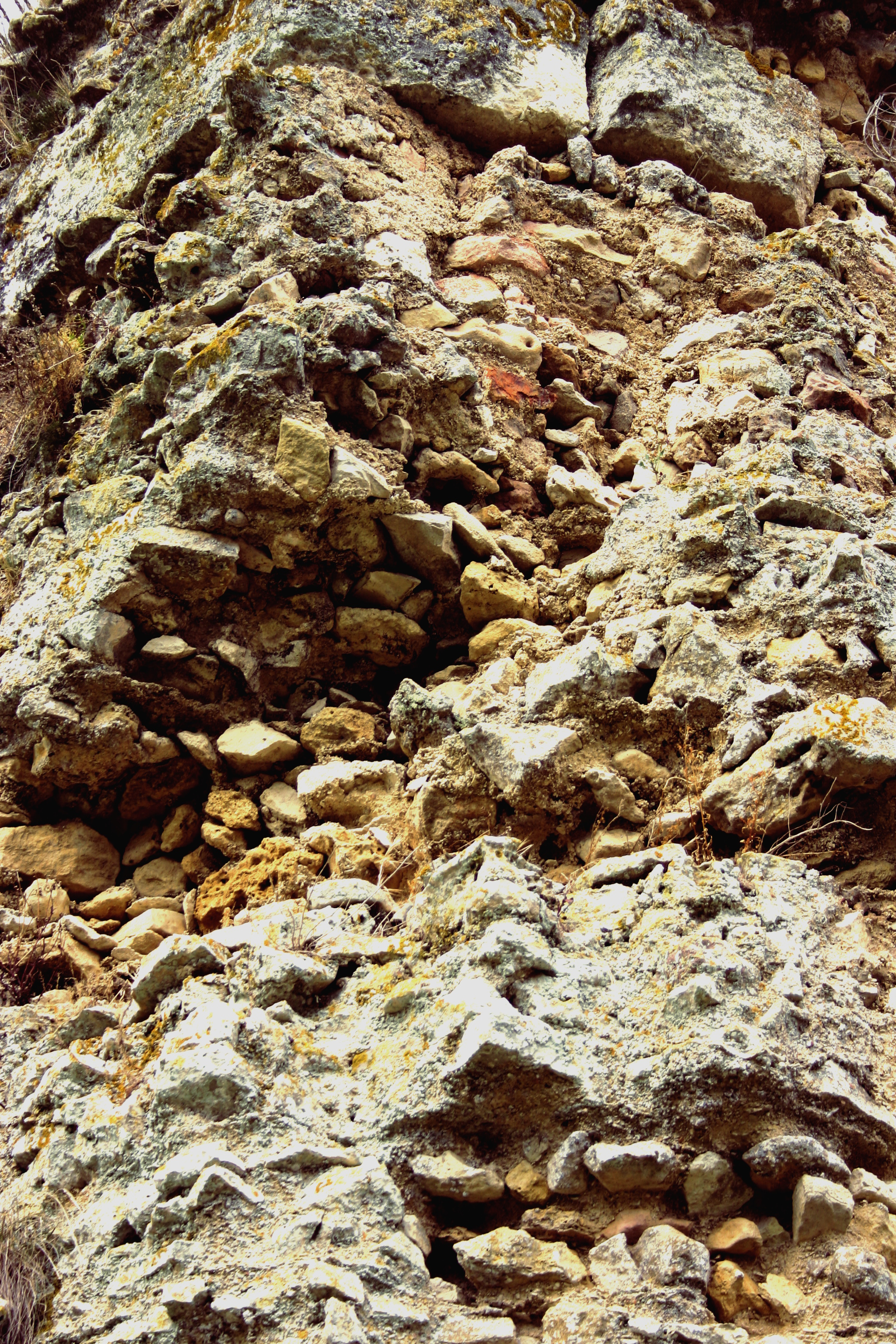
Masonry detail

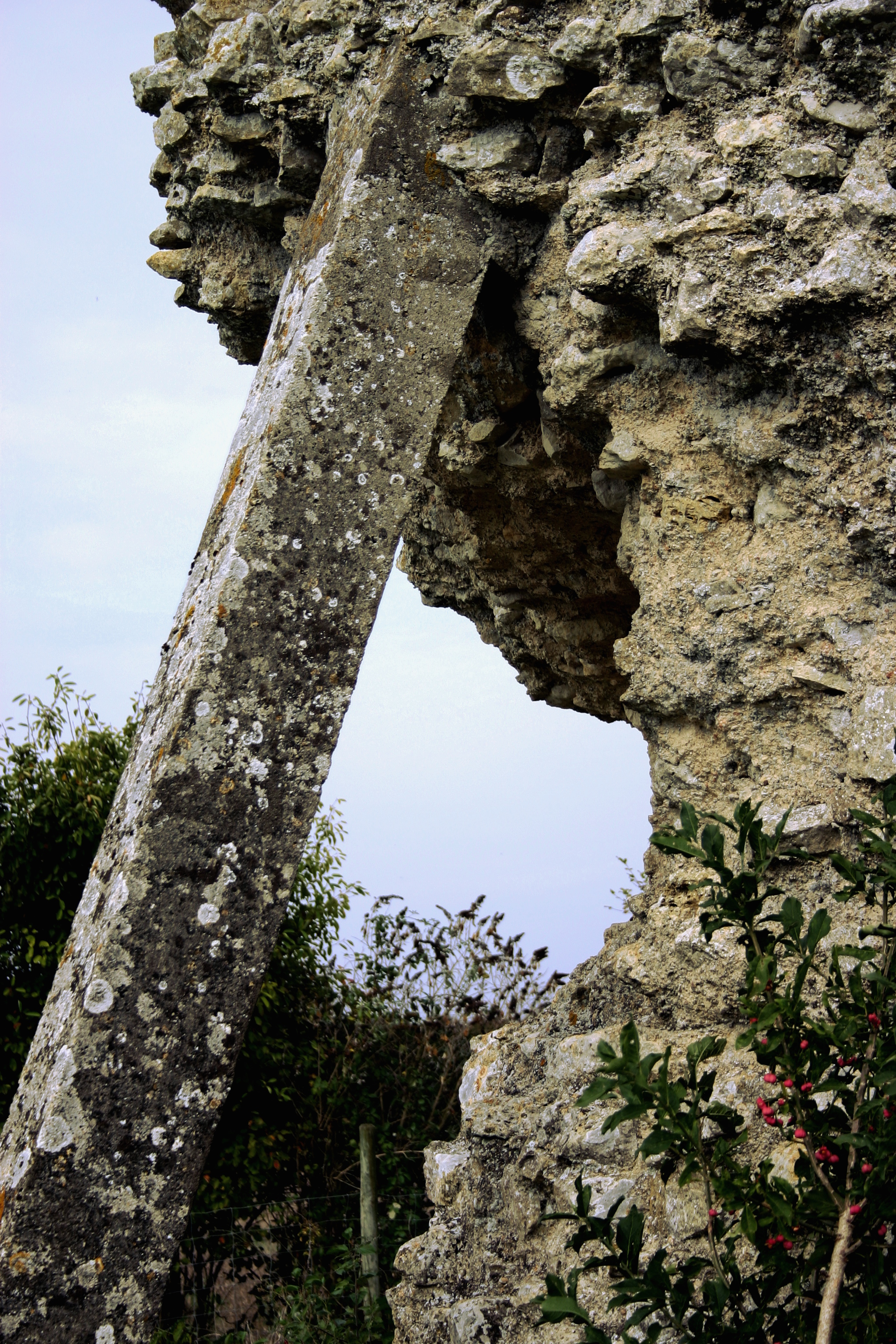
Supporting pillar

== See also ==
- List of French historic monuments protected in 1840

== Bibliography ==
- Creissen, Thomas (2019). "Les mausolées de la fin de l'Antiquité au Moyen Âge central : entre gestion d'un héritage et genèse de nouveaux modèles" [Mausoleums from Late Antiquity to the Middle Ages: between managing a legacy and creating new models]. Gallia (in French). LXXVI (1): 257–274. doi:10.4000/gallia.4560.
- Lauzun, Philippe (1898). "Inventaire général des piles gallo-romaines du sud-ouest de la France et plus particulièrement du département du Gers" [General inventory of Gallo-Roman piers in south-west France, particularly in the Gers department]. Bulletin Monumental (in French). LXIII. Caen: Henri Delesques imprimeur-éditeur: 5–68. doi:10.3406/bulmo.1898.11144.
- Maurin, Louis (1999). La Charente-Maritime [Charente-Maritime]. Carte archéologique de la Gaule (no 17/1) (in French). Paris: Académie des inscriptions et belles-lettres. ISBN 978-2-8775-4061-2.
