= Villelongue-d'Aude =

Commune in Occitanie, France

- Commune
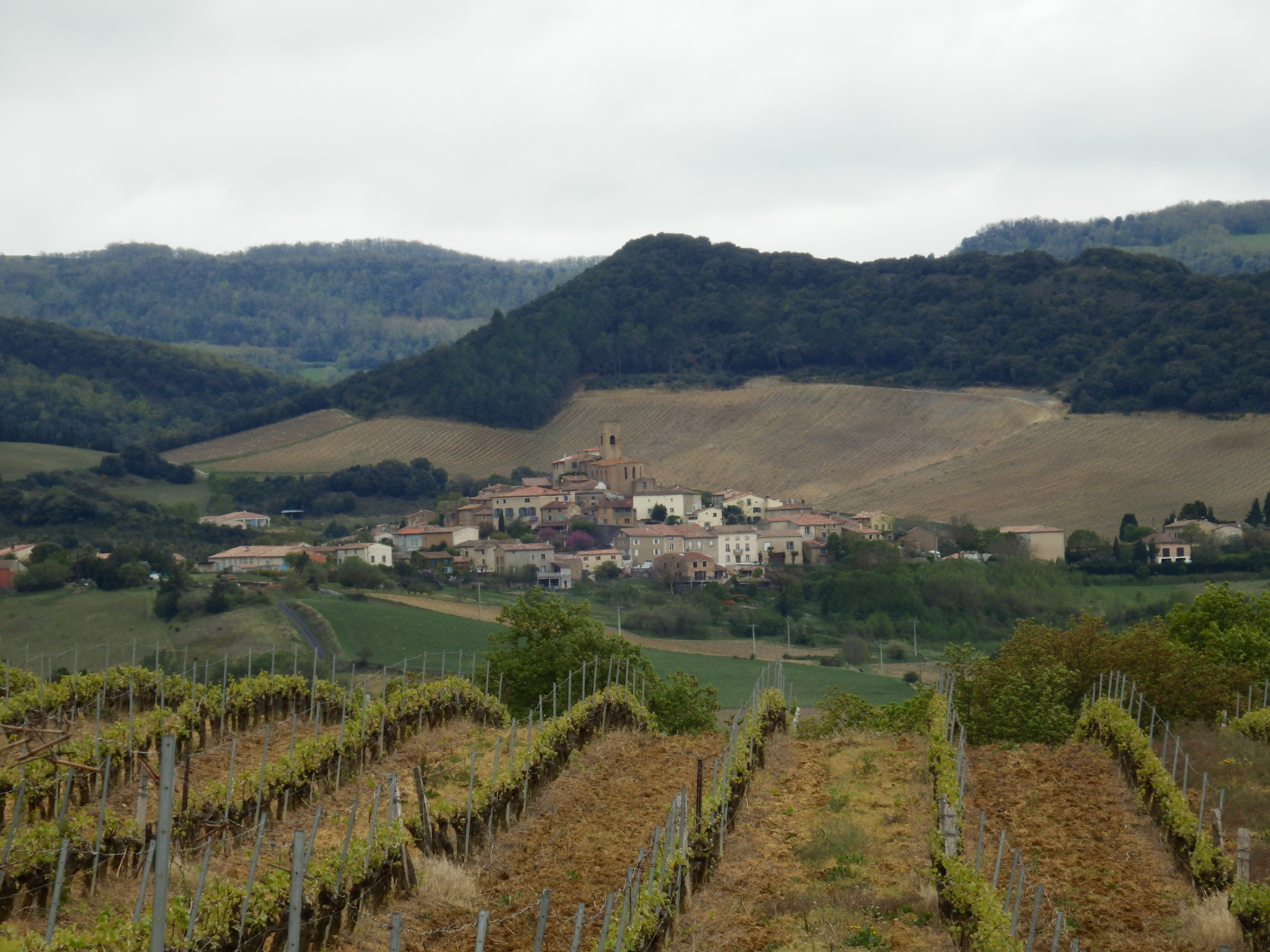
- A general view of Villelongue-d'Aude

- Coat of arms
- Location of Villelongue-d'Aude
- Location within France Location within Occitanie
- Coordinates: 43°03′19″N 2°05′45″E
- Country: France
- Region: Occitania
- Department: Aude
- Arrondissement: Limoux
- Canton: La Région Limouxine

Government
  - Mayor (2020–2026): Marie-Claudine Laffont
- Area^{1}: 13.11 km^{2} (5.06 sq mi)
- Elevation: 345 m (1,132 ft)
- Highest elevation: 580 m (1,900 ft)
- Lowest elevation: 239 m (784 ft)
- Population (2023): 321
  - Density: 24.5/km^{2} (63.4/sq mi)
- Time zone: UTC+01:00 (CET)
  - Summer (DST): UTC+02:00 (CEST)
- INSEE/Postal code: 11427 /11300
- ^{1} French Land Register data, which excludes lakes, ponds, glaciers > 1 km^{2} (0.386 sq mi or 247 acres) and river estuaries.

Villelongue-d'Aude (French pronunciation: [vil.lɔ̃ɡ dod]; Occitan: Vilalonga d'Aude) is a commune in the Aude department in southern France.

== Population ==
Historical population
Year	Pop.	±% p.a.
1968	305	—
1975	260	−2.25%
1982	258	−0.11%
1990	286	+1.30%
1999	279	−0.27%
2007	327	+2.00%
2012	316	−0.68%
2017	305	−0.71%
2023	321	+0.86%
Source: INSEE

== See also ==
- Communes of the Aude department
