= Authon-Ébéon =

- Commune
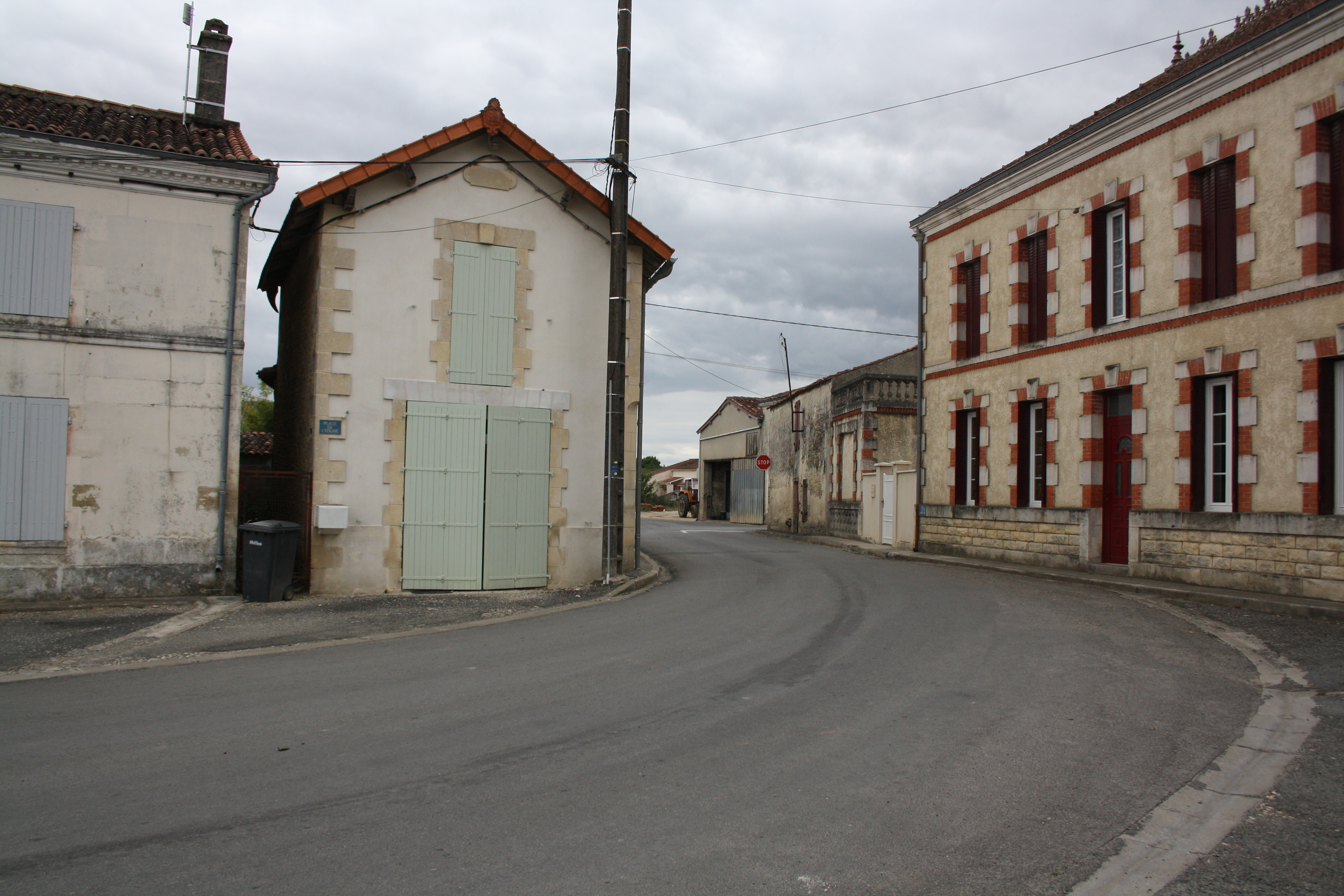
- Authon village
- Location of Authon-Ébéon
- Location within France Location within Nouvelle-Aquitaine
- Coordinates: 45°50′13″N 0°24′26″W
- Country: France
- Region: Nouvelle-Aquitaine
- Department: Charente-Maritime
- Arrondissement: Saint-Jean-d'Angély
- Canton: Chaniers
- Intercommunality: CC Vals Saintonge

Government
  - Mayor (2020–2026): Jean-Claude Caillault
- Area^{1}: 11.65 km^{2} (4.50 sq mi)
- Elevation: 30 m (98 ft)
- Highest elevation: 36 m (118 ft)
- Lowest elevation: 16 m (52 ft)
- Population (2023): 410
  - Density: 35/km^{2} (91/sq mi)
- Time zone: UTC+01:00 (CET)
  - Summer (DST): UTC+02:00 (CEST)
- INSEE/Postal code: 17026 /17770
- ^{1} French Land Register data, which excludes lakes, ponds, glaciers > 1 km^{2} (0.386 sq mi or 247 acres) and river estuaries.

Authon-Ébéon (French pronunciation: [otɔ̃ ebeɔ̃]) is a commune in the Charente-Maritime department in the Nouvelle-Aquitaine region of south-western France.

== Geography ==
Authon-Ébéon is located in the north-east of the department of Charente-Maritime some 25 km north-east of Saintes and 20 km south-east of Saint-Jean-d'Angély and is in the former province of Saintonge. The village is at the crossroads of the D120 from Sainte-Même in the north to Migron in the south and the D134 from Brizambourg in the west to Courcerac in the east. The D129 also forms the north-western border of the commune. Apart from the village there are the hamlets of Bargagne in the south and Ebeon in the north. The commune is mostly farmland with some small scattered forests.

=== Geology and terrain ===
Geologically the commune is on a limestone plateau from the Tithonian period (formerly called the Portlandian).

The commune vineyards are located in the Appellation d'origine contrôlée (AOC) cognac zone for Cru des Fins Bois.

=== Hydrography ===
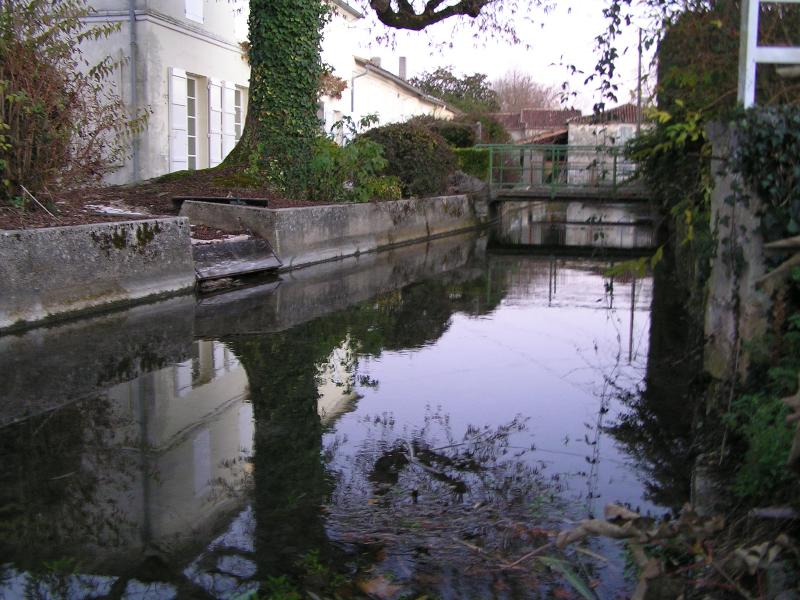
The Dandelot at Authon

Authon-Ébéon is in the Drainage basin of the Charente. Authon is crossed by the Dandelot which feeds the castle moat. It joins the Antenne, a tributary of the Charente, just downstream of Cognac.

== History ==
Ébéon was along the Saintes-Aulnay-Poitiers Roman road, along which is the "Ébéon beacon" (also called the Pyramid).

Authon was the seat of a fief held by the Authon family from 1130 to 1450. The Motte-and-bailey castle was 100 metres from the present castle.

Seguin d'Authon, a vassal of the Counts of Taillebourg, was a Crusader in 1130 and Roland d'Authon was a companion of Saint Louis in the Holy Land. Seguin, who died in 1395, was Archbishop of Tours.

Jean d'Authon (1467-1527) was chaplain and official historian for King Louis XII. Antoine (1466-1546) was a corsair. In the early 17th century the barons of Authon were hereditary seneschals of Saintonge.

In 1627 Jean d'Authon was killed in a duel, and his widow Judith de Nosan sold the barony and the land at Ébéon that was attached to it. It was redeemed by her mother, who bequeathed it to her grandson.

In 1651, during the Fronde, Condé took the castle and imprisoned Jean-Seguin d'Authon.

The state of the parishes of 1686 show that the parish of Authon had the Baron of Authon as lord and the parish of Esbuon had 25 fires and Mr. Naussay as lord. The land in the two parishes was difficult and produced two-thirds cereals and one third wine.

In 1791 Authon was looted and burned and the north wing of the castle disappeared.

The communes of Authon and Ébéon were created in 1793 in the department of Lower Charente which became Charente-Maritime in 1941. They were part of the district of Saint-Jean-d'Angély then in its arrondissement in 1801, then passed to Saintes arrondissement in 1926 before returning to that of Saint-Jean-d'Angély in 1943. After having been part of the Canton of Brisambourg in 1793, it joined the Caton of Saint-Hilaire-de-Villefranche in 1801.

By a decree dated 12 December 1972 with effect from 1 January 1973, Ebéon joined Authon to form the commune Authon-Ébéon.

== Administration ==
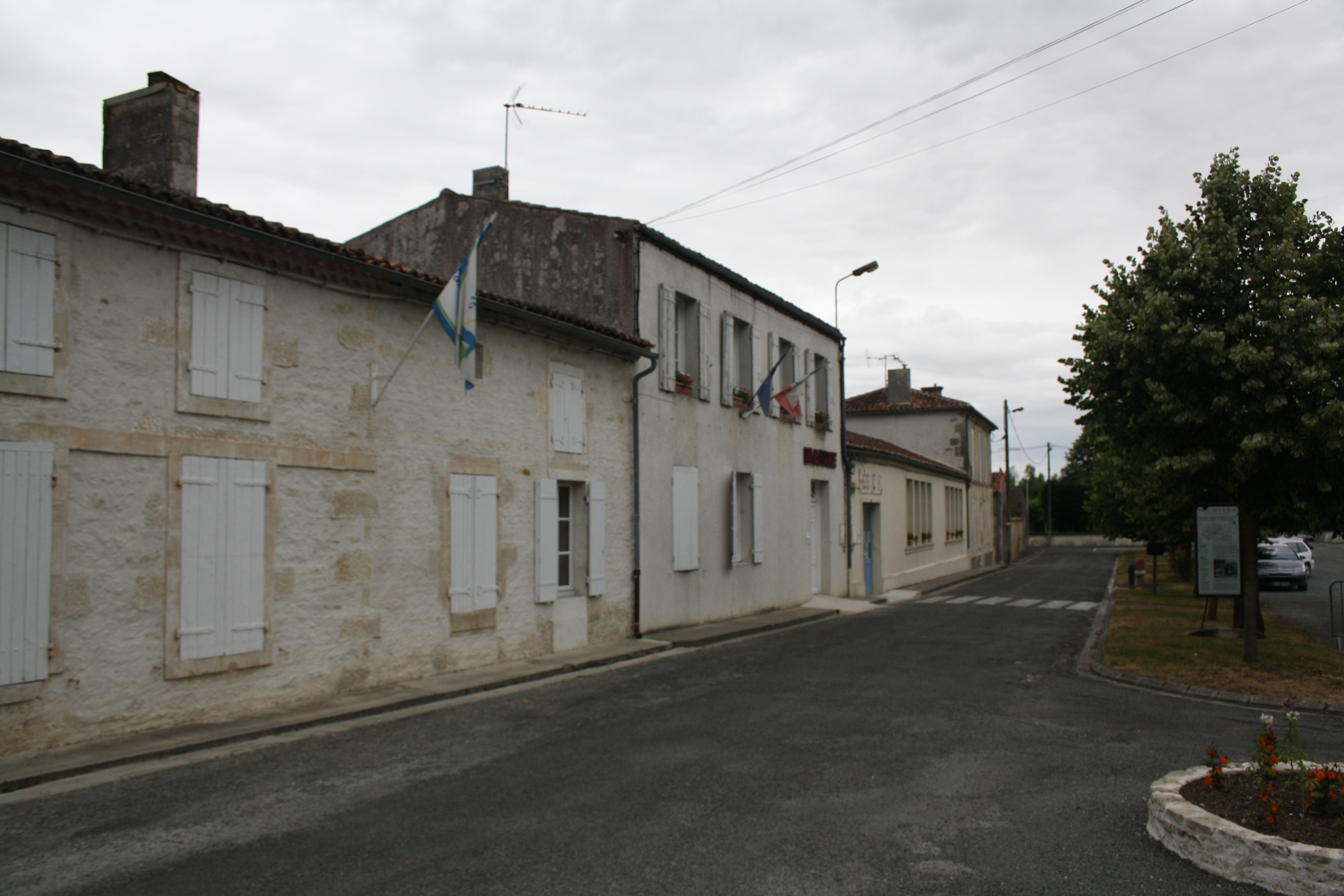
The Town Hall

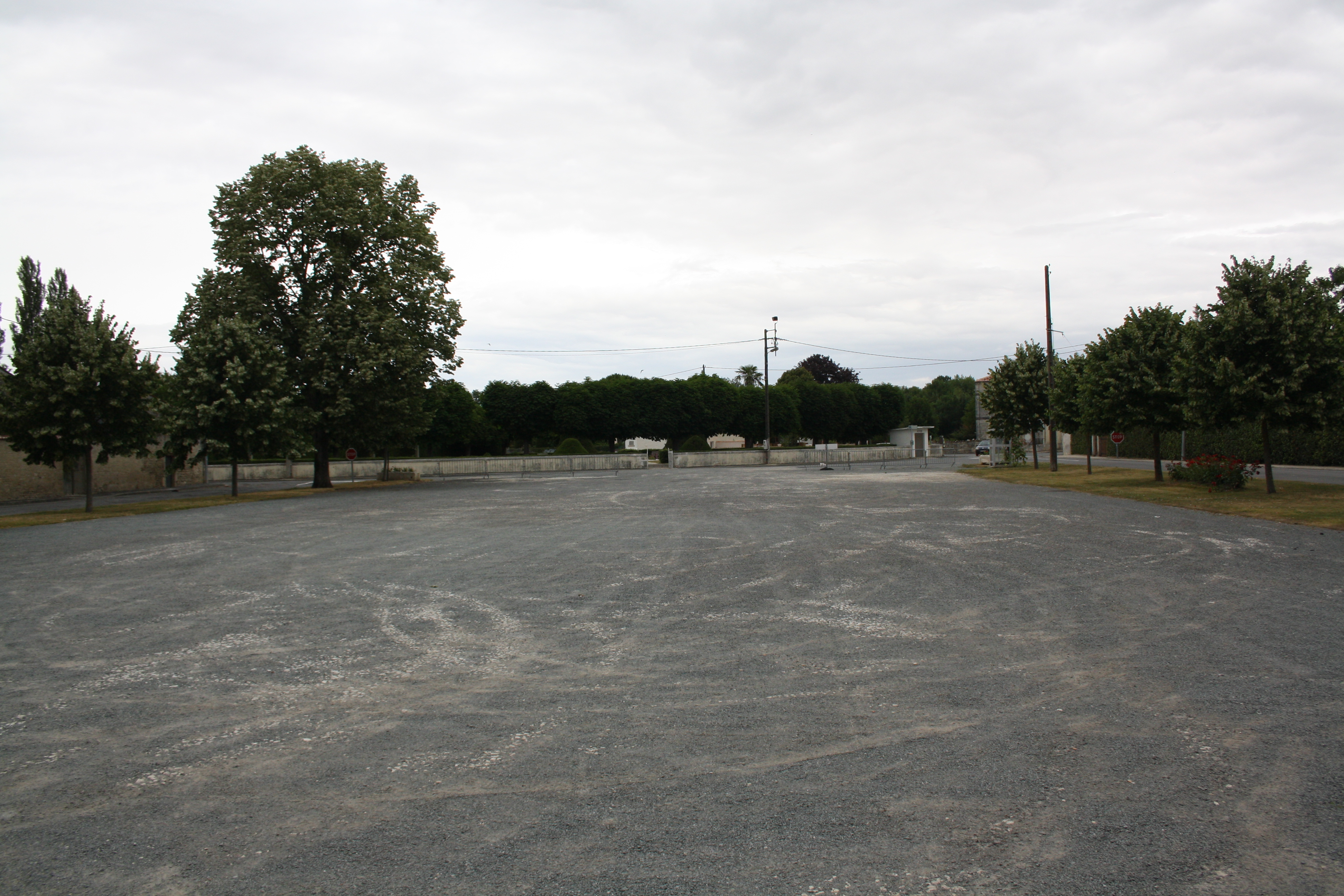
The Village Square

List of Successive Mayors

| From | To | Name |
|---|---|---|
| 2001 | 2020 | Claude Boulétreau |
| 2020 | 2026 | Jean-Claude Caillault |

The commune is part of the Canton of Chaniers and of the Communauté de communes des Vals de Saintonge.

=== Taxation ===
Taxation is at a rate of 11.97% for housing tax, 16.63% for developed land, 54.30% for undeveloped, and 15% for business tax plus the community of communes fee on all four taxes, respectively 2.50%, 4.57%, 10.99% and 3.24% gives the total, before adding for the department and the region, of 14.47% for housing, 21.20% for developed land, 65.29% for undeveloped land, and 18.24% business tax (2007 figures).

== Demography ==
The inhabitants of the commune are known as Authonais or Authonaises. in French.

Historical population

| Year | Pop. | ±% p.a. |
|---|---|---|
| 1793 | 867 | — |
| 1821 | 835 | −0.13% |
| 1846 | 926 | +0.41% |
| 1872 | 831 | −0.42% |
| 1901 | 772 | −0.25% |
| 1926 | 583 | −1.12% |
| 1946 | 481 | −0.96% |
| 1962 | 538 | +0.70% |
| 1968 | 526 | −0.38% |

| Year | Pop. | ±% p.a. |
|---|---|---|
| 1975 | 477 | −1.39% |
| 1982 | 512 | +1.02% |
| 1990 | 460 | −1.33% |
| 1999 | 407 | −1.35% |
| 2007 | 388 | −0.60% |
| 2012 | 393 | +0.26% |
| 2017 | 390 | −0.15% |
| 2023 | 410 | +0.84% |

Source: EHESS and INSEE

N.B. Prior to 1975 the table shows the total populations for the two communes Authon and Ébéon.

== Economy ==
A trade in brooms existed in the 19th century. Currently the economy is primarily agricultural with grapes, plant nurseries, organic crops, and cattle pastures. The monthly fair is on the third Monday in the month.

As of 2017, the commune has 174 employable people with an unemployment rate of 12.9%. Of the 174 employable people, 87 are men and 87 are women. 84% are employees, and 78% work outside the commune.

== Culture and heritage ==
=== Civil heritage ===
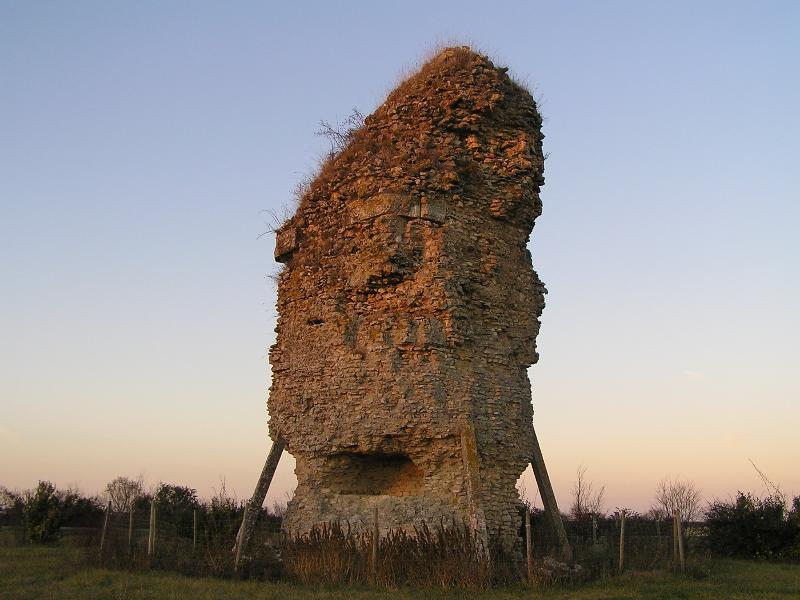
The Pyramid or Ébéon beacon

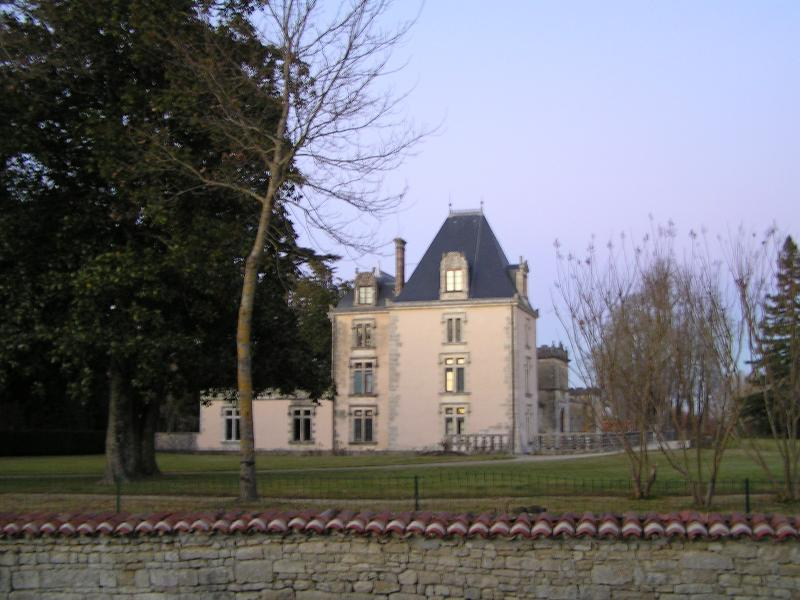
The Chateau of Authon

The commune has a number of buildings and structures that are registered as historical monuments:

- The Pyramid (Gallo-Roman) The "beacon" of Ebéon is called the "Pyramid" and is a Gallo-Roman remains at a place called "Bois-Charmand". This beacon or tomb still forms a masonry block 16 metres high and 6 metres in diameter. According to a local legend it was the work of fairies: three "ladies" who built it overnight. They used an enchanted hammer that they bounced back and forth to each other through the air. It hit the youngest in the forehead and she was killed. There is also another well-preserved tower or stack near Saujon: the Tour de Pirelongue.
- The Chateau of Authon. The chateau is moated with the moat fed by the Dandelot. It is a construction from the 16th century which was largely redesigned in the following centuries. The guard tower and the front door of the castle date back to 1580 and the angled wing with mullioned windows dates to 1606.
- The Chateau Park. The park is surrounded by water and is registered as an outstanding gardens. There is also a medieval garden.

Other sites of interest are

- Traces of the Roman road from Saintes-Aulnay-Poitiers.
- Remains of Merovingian cemeteries.
- Vestiges of a feudal Motte-and-bailey castle.
- The Mill located downstream of Guignebourg.

=== Religious heritage ===
The commune has one religious building that is registered as an historical monument:

- The Church of Notre-Dame (12th century). The Church of Notre-Dame is a fortified church with a curtain wall, a walkway, slots, a bell tower, and a gatehouse. Its construction was carried out in two stages: first in the 12th century then in the 15th century when it was fortified. The facade has two serrated platforms on its angled buttresses connected by a passageway with cruciform notches for archers. The Chevet also has a crenellated roof. The church also has murals from the 19th century.
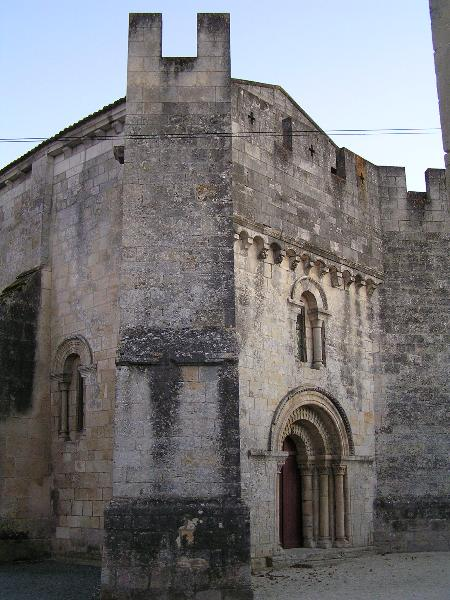
Church of Notre-Dame entrance

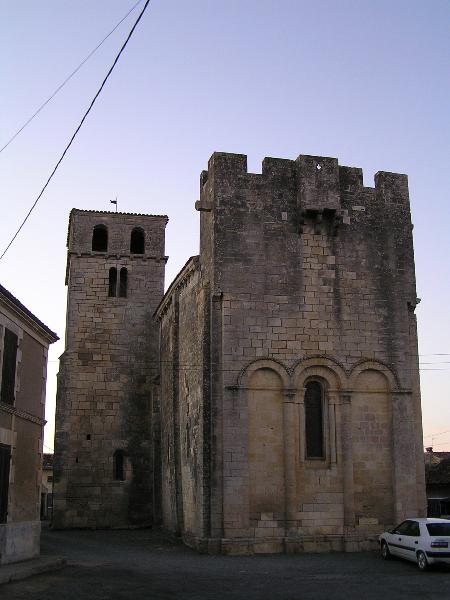
Church of Notre-Dame bell tower

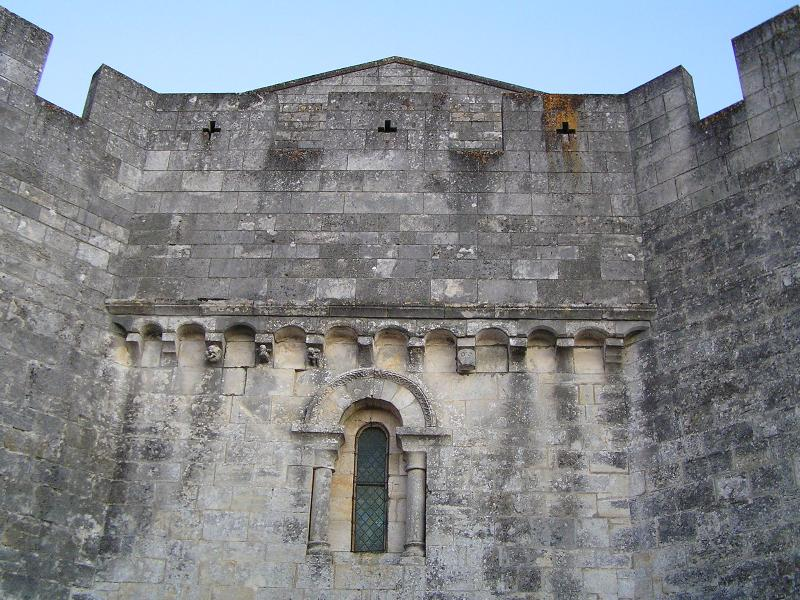
Church of Notre-Dame wall
- The Church of Ebéon is a recent church with a gabled facade.
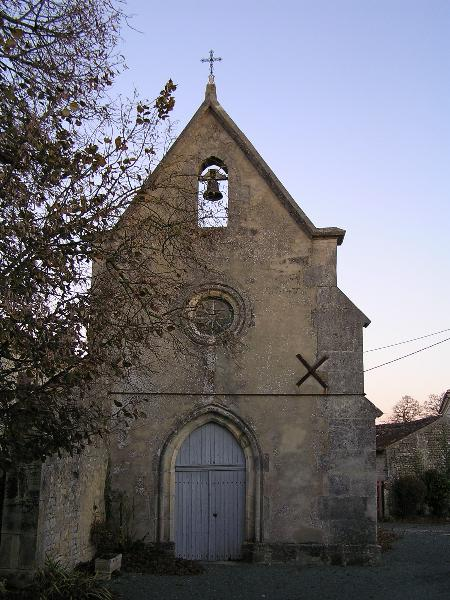
Church of Ébéon entrance

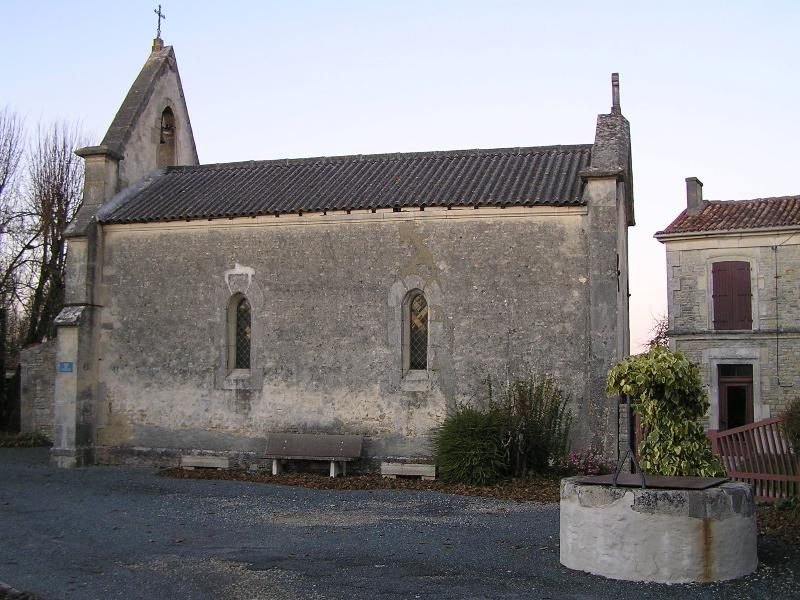
Church of Ébéon side

== Facilities ==
The primary school is in the church square at Authon.

There is a post office at Rue de la Poste in Authon.

The closest doctors and nurses are at Matha. Clinics and hospitals are at Cognac, Saint-Jean-d'Angély, and Saintes.

=== Local life ===
The harvest festival is held on the last Sunday of October.

== Notable people linked to the commune ==
- Jehan d'Authon, chaplain and official historian for King Louis XII.

== See also ==
- Communes of the Charente-Maritime department
- Authon-Ébéon pyramid
