= Saint-Romain-de-Benet =

- Commune
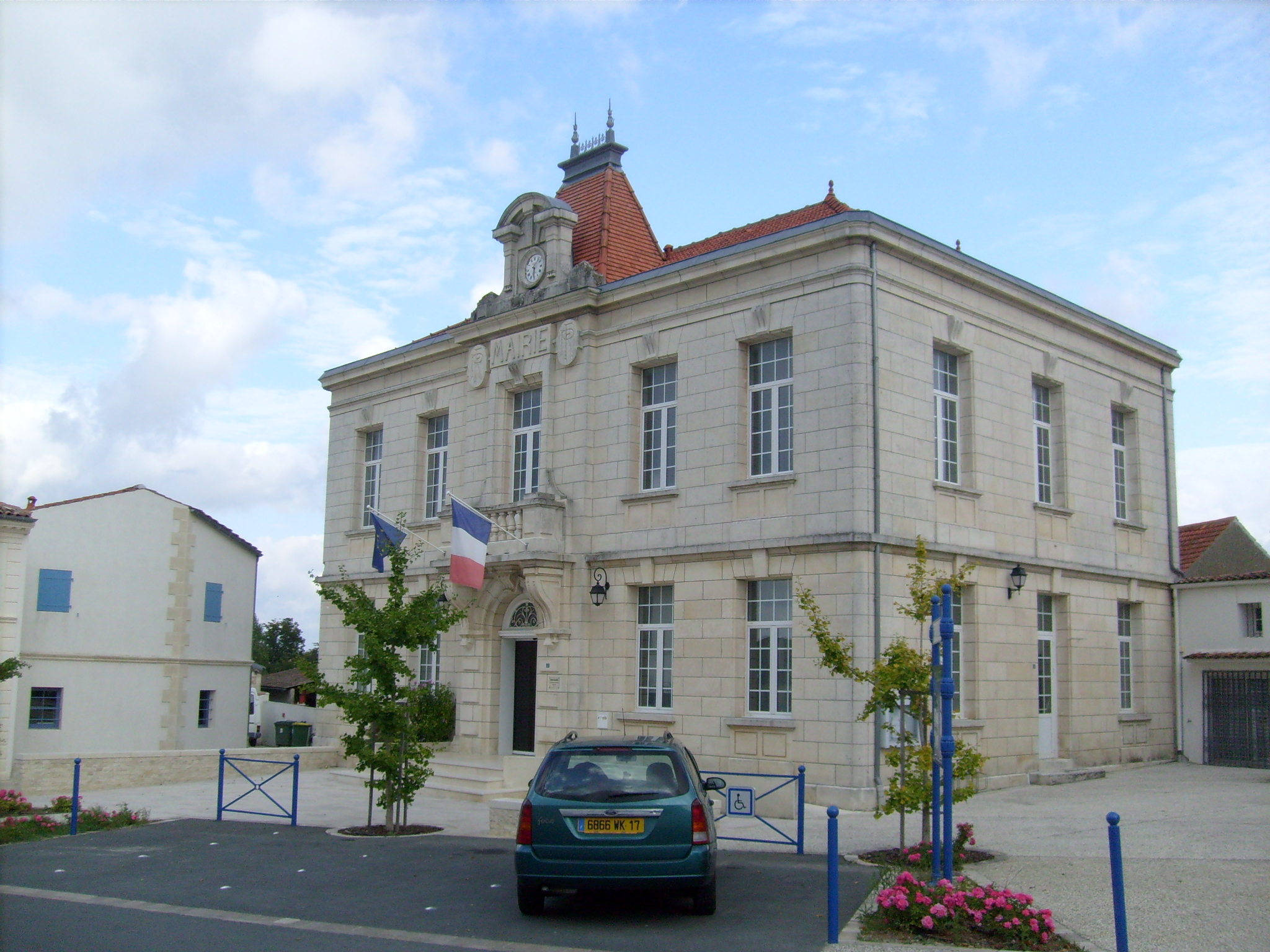
- The town hall in Saint-Romain-de-Benet
- Location of Saint-Romain-de-Benet
- Location within France Location within Nouvelle-Aquitaine
- Coordinates: 45°41′33″N 0°50′46″W
- Country: France
- Region: Nouvelle-Aquitaine
- Department: Charente-Maritime
- Arrondissement: Saintes
- Canton: Saujon
- Intercommunality: CA Royan Atlantique

Government
  - Mayor (2020–2026): Serge Roy
- Area^{1}: 32.78 km^{2} (12.66 sq mi)
- Highest elevation: 47 m (154 ft)
- Lowest elevation: 3 m (9.8 ft)
- Population (2023): 1,801
  - Density: 54.94/km^{2} (142.3/sq mi)
- Time zone: UTC+01:00 (CET)
  - Summer (DST): UTC+02:00 (CEST)
- INSEE/Postal code: 17393 /17600
- ^{1} French Land Register data, which excludes lakes, ponds, glaciers > 1 km^{2} (0.386 sq mi or 247 acres) and river estuaries.

Saint-Romain-de-Benet (French pronunciation: [sɛ̃ ʁɔmɛ̃ də bənɛ]) is a commune in the Charente-Maritime department in southwestern France.

== Population ==
Historical population
Year	Pop.	±% p.a.
1968	1,130	—
1975	1,064	−0.86%
1982	1,157	+1.20%
1990	1,244	+0.91%
1999	1,374	+1.11%
2007	1,594	+1.87%
2012	1,658	+0.79%
2017	1,712	+0.64%
2023	1,801	+0.85%
Source: INSEE

== See also ==
- Communes of the Charente-Maritime department
