= Chives (disambiguation) =

Chives is a member of the onion family grown for its leaves, which are used as a condiment.

Chives may also refer to:

- Chives, Charente-Maritime, a commune in the Charente-Maritime département, France
- The Chive, entertainment website
- Garlic chives or Chinese chives
