= Paille =

Paillé is a commune in France

Paille or Paillé may also refer to:

- Daniel Paille (born 1984), ice hockey player
- Daniel Paillé (born 1950), politician
- Marcel Paille (1932–2002), ice hockey player
- Pascal-Pierre Paillé (born 1978), politician
- Stéphane Paille (born 1965), footballer
- Suzanne Amomba Paillé (ca. 1673-1683-1755), French Guinean planter and philanthropist

== See also ==
- Pommes paille, French name for a type of French fries
- Paille-maille, lawn game
- Vin de paille, French term for straw wine
