= Saint-Ouen-la-Thène =

- Commune
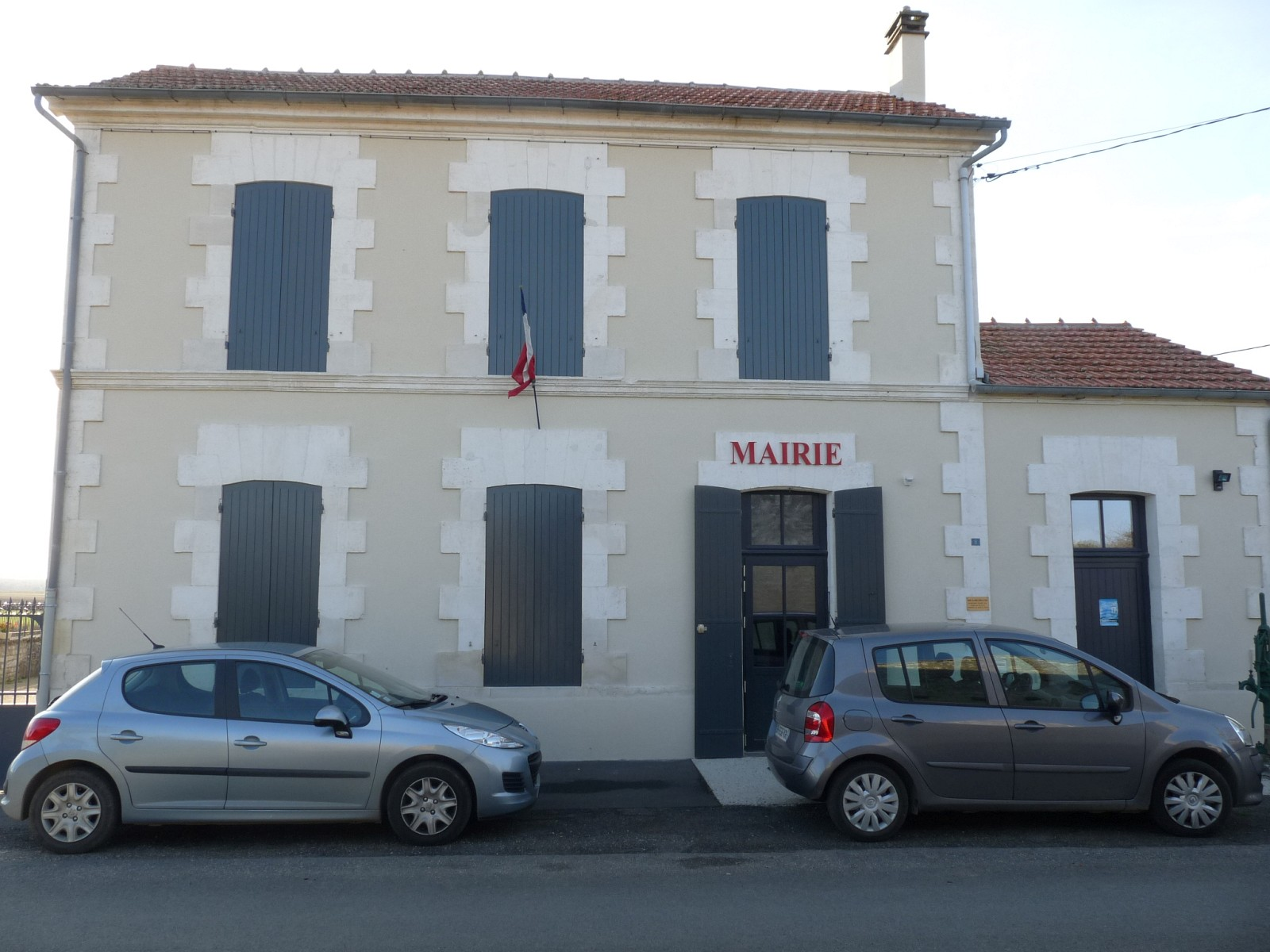
- The town hall in Saint-Ouen-la-Thène
- Location of Saint-Ouen-la-Thène
- Location within France Location within Nouvelle-Aquitaine
- Coordinates: 45°52′20″N 0°09′42″W
- Country: France
- Region: Nouvelle-Aquitaine
- Department: Charente-Maritime
- Arrondissement: Saint-Jean-d'Angély
- Canton: Matha

Government
  - Mayor (2020–2026): Jean-Michel Piolot
- Area^{1}: 7.01 km^{2} (2.71 sq mi)
- Elevation: 80 m (260 ft)
- Highest elevation: 138 m (453 ft)
- Lowest elevation: 72 m (236 ft)
- Population (2023): 147
  - Density: 21.0/km^{2} (54.3/sq mi)
- Time zone: UTC+01:00 (CET)
  - Summer (DST): UTC+02:00 (CEST)
- INSEE/Postal code: 17377 /17490
- ^{1} French Land Register data, which excludes lakes, ponds, glaciers > 1 km^{2} (0.386 sq mi or 247 acres) and river estuaries.

Saint-Ouen-la-Thène (French pronunciation: [sɛ̃.t‿wɛ̃ la tɛn]; before 2013: Saint-Ouen) is a commune in the Charente-Maritime department in southwestern France.

== Population ==
Historical population
| Year | Pop. | ±% p.a. |
|---|---|---|
| 1968 | 180 | — |
| 1975 | 160 | −1.67% |
| 1982 | 153 | −0.64% |
| 1990 | 147 | −0.50% |
| 1999 | 145 | −0.15% |
| 2007 | 137 | −0.71% |
| 2012 | 122 | −2.29% |
| 2017 | 114 | −1.35% |
| 2023 | 147 | +4.33% |
Source: INSEE

== See also ==
- Communes of the Charente-Maritime department
