= Le Gicq =

- Commune
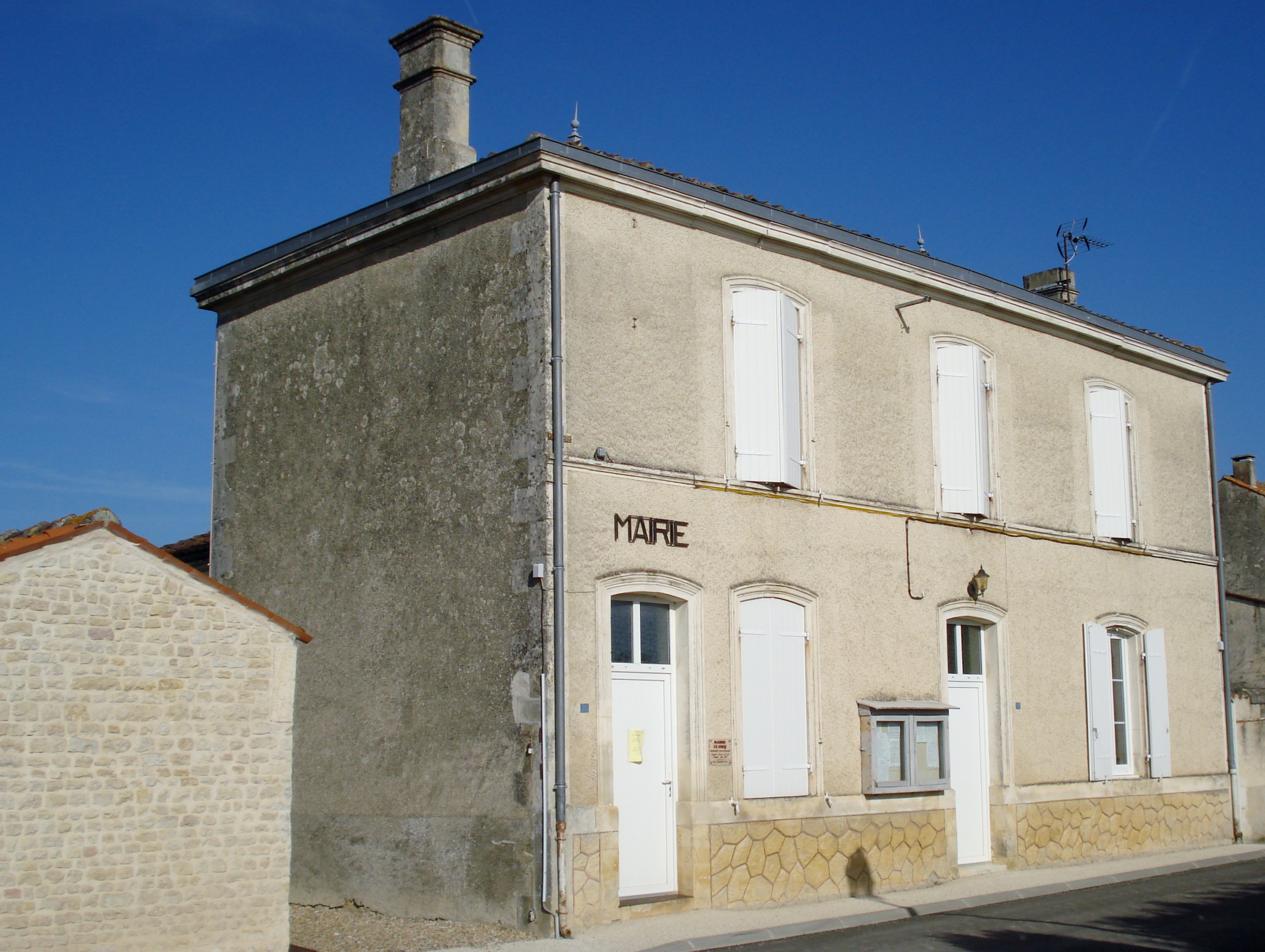
- The town hall in Le Gicq
- Location of Le Gicq
- Location within France Location within Nouvelle-Aquitaine
- Coordinates: 45°55′57″N 0°14′34″W
- Country: France
- Region: Nouvelle-Aquitaine
- Department: Charente-Maritime
- Arrondissement: Saint-Jean-d'Angély
- Canton: Matha

Government
  - Mayor (2020–2026): Jean-Mary Boisnier
- Area^{1}: 5.97 km^{2} (2.31 sq mi)
- Highest elevation: 98 m (322 ft)
- Lowest elevation: 58 m (190 ft)
- Population (2023): 121
  - Density: 20.3/km^{2} (52.5/sq mi)
- Time zone: UTC+01:00 (CET)
  - Summer (DST): UTC+02:00 (CEST)
- INSEE/Postal code: 17177 /17160
- ^{1} French Land Register data, which excludes lakes, ponds, glaciers > 1 km^{2} (0.386 sq mi or 247 acres) and river estuaries.

Le Gicq (French pronunciation: [lə ʒik]) is a commune in the Charente-Maritime department in southwestern France.

== Population ==
Historical population
Year	Pop.	±% p.a.
1968	159	—
1975	138	−2.00%
1982	118	−2.21%
1990	102	−1.80%
1999	101	−0.11%
2007	115	+1.64%
2012	132	+2.80%
2017	125	−1.08%
2023	121	−0.54%
Source: INSEE

== See also ==
- Communes of the Charente-Maritime department
