= Varaize =

- Commune
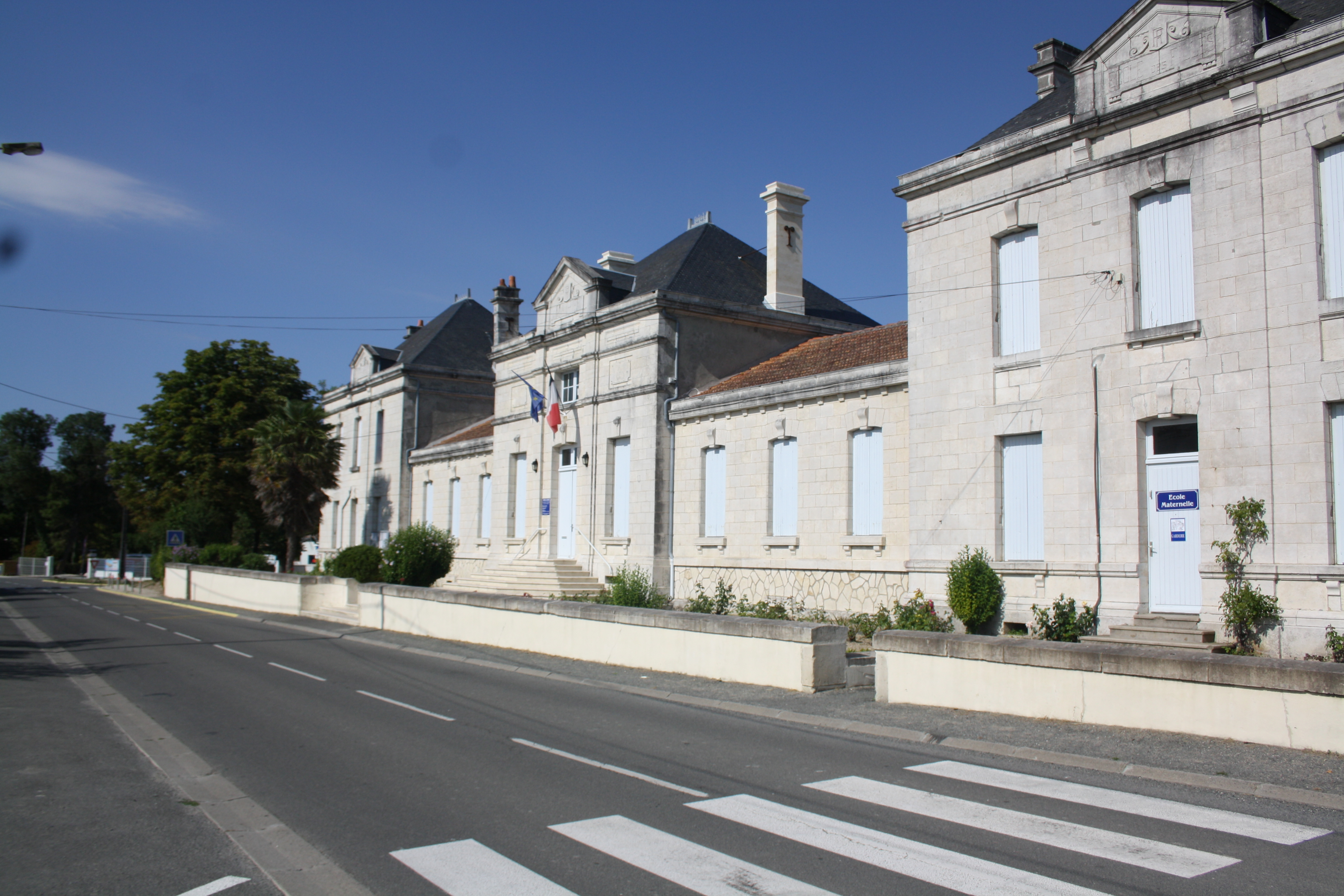
- Town hall
- Location of Varaize
- Location within France Location within Nouvelle-Aquitaine
- Coordinates: 45°55′25″N 0°25′16″W
- Country: France
- Region: Nouvelle-Aquitaine
- Department: Charente-Maritime
- Arrondissement: Saint-Jean-d'Angély
- Canton: Matha

Government
  - Mayor (2020–2026): Alain Bertin
- Area^{1}: 20.48 km^{2} (7.91 sq mi)
- Elevation: 30 m (98 ft)
- Highest elevation: 83 m (272 ft)
- Lowest elevation: 18 m (59 ft)
- Population (2023): 533
  - Density: 26.0/km^{2} (67.4/sq mi)
- Time zone: UTC+01:00 (CET)
  - Summer (DST): UTC+02:00 (CEST)
- INSEE/Postal code: 17459 /17400
- ^{1} French Land Register data, which excludes lakes, ponds, glaciers > 1 km^{2} (0.386 sq mi or 247 acres) and river estuaries.

Varaize (French pronunciation: [vaʁɛz]) is a commune in the Charente-Maritime department in southwestern France.

== Population ==
Historical population
Year	Pop.	±% p.a.
1968	770	—
1975	646	−2.48%
1982	644	−0.04%
1990	594	−1.01%
1999	563	−0.59%
2007	580	+0.37%
2012	560	−0.70%
2017	560	+0.00%
2023	533	−0.82%
Source: INSEE

== See also ==
- Communes of the Charente-Maritime department
