= La Villedieu, Charente-Maritime =

La Villedieu
- Commune
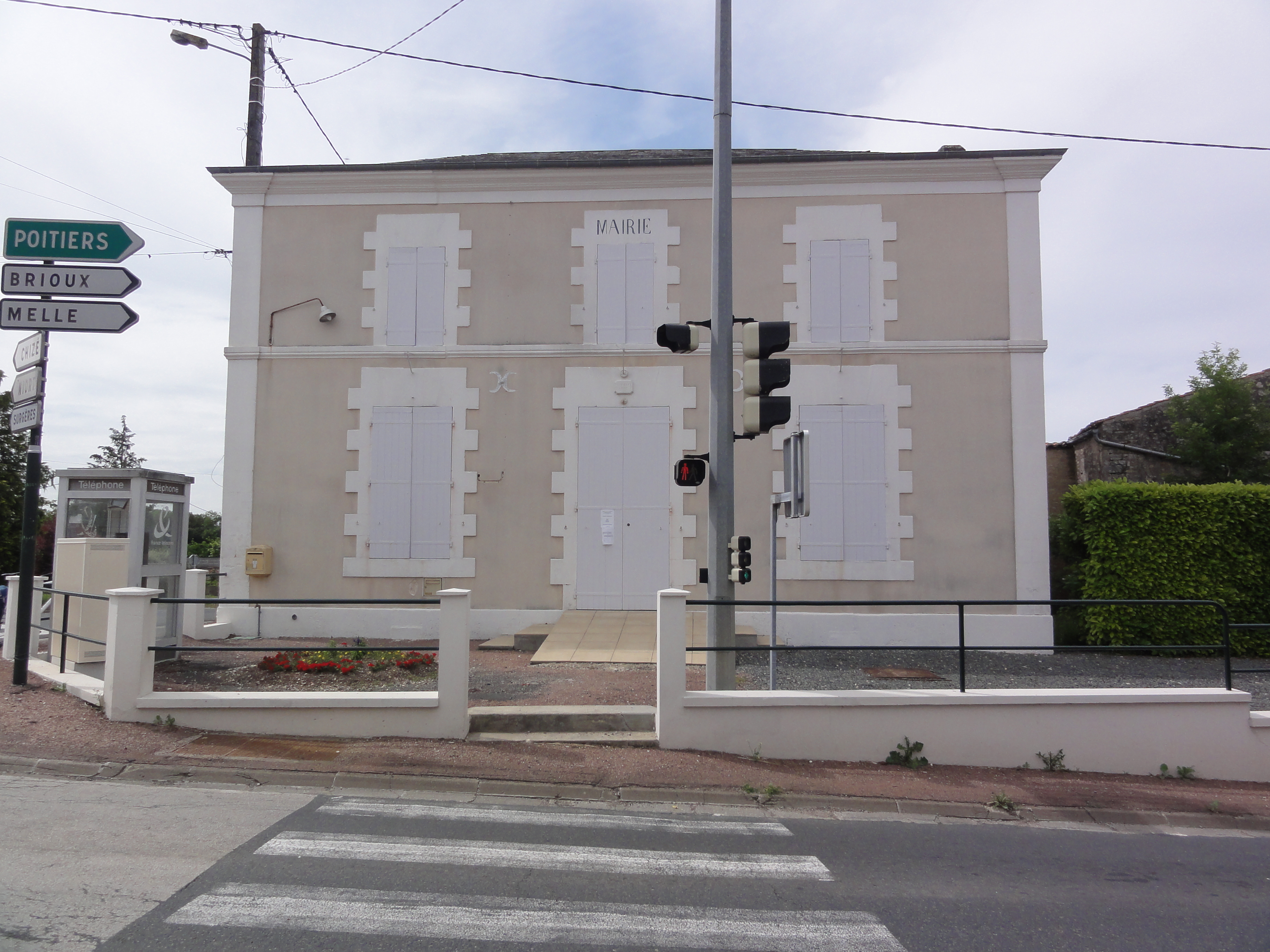
- The town hall in La Villedieu
- Location of La Villedieu
- Location within France Location within Nouvelle-Aquitaine
- Coordinates: 46°03′44″N 0°19′16″W
- Country: France
- Region: Nouvelle-Aquitaine
- Department: Charente-Maritime
- Arrondissement: Saint-Jean-d'Angély
- Canton: Matha

Government
  - Mayor (2020–2026): Alain Villeneuve
- Area^{1}: 22.27 km^{2} (8.60 sq mi)
- Highest elevation: 128 m (420 ft)
- Lowest elevation: 53 m (174 ft)
- Population (2023): 200
  - Density: 9.0/km^{2} (23/sq mi)
- Time zone: UTC+01:00 (CET)
  - Summer (DST): UTC+02:00 (CEST)
- INSEE/Postal code: 17471 /17470
- ^{1} French Land Register data, which excludes lakes, ponds, glaciers > 1 km^{2} (0.386 sq mi or 247 acres) and river estuaries.

La Villedieu (French pronunciation: [la vildjø]) is a commune in the Charente-Maritime department in southwestern France.

== Population ==
Historical population
Year	Pop.	±% p.a.
1968	368	—
1975	320	−1.98%
1982	285	−1.64%
1990	323	+1.58%
1999	264	−2.22%
2007	230	−1.71%
2012	217	−1.16%
2017	209	−0.75%
2023	200	−0.73%
Source: INSEE

== See also ==
- Communes of the Charente-Maritime department
