= Saint-Mandé-sur-Brédoire =

- Commune
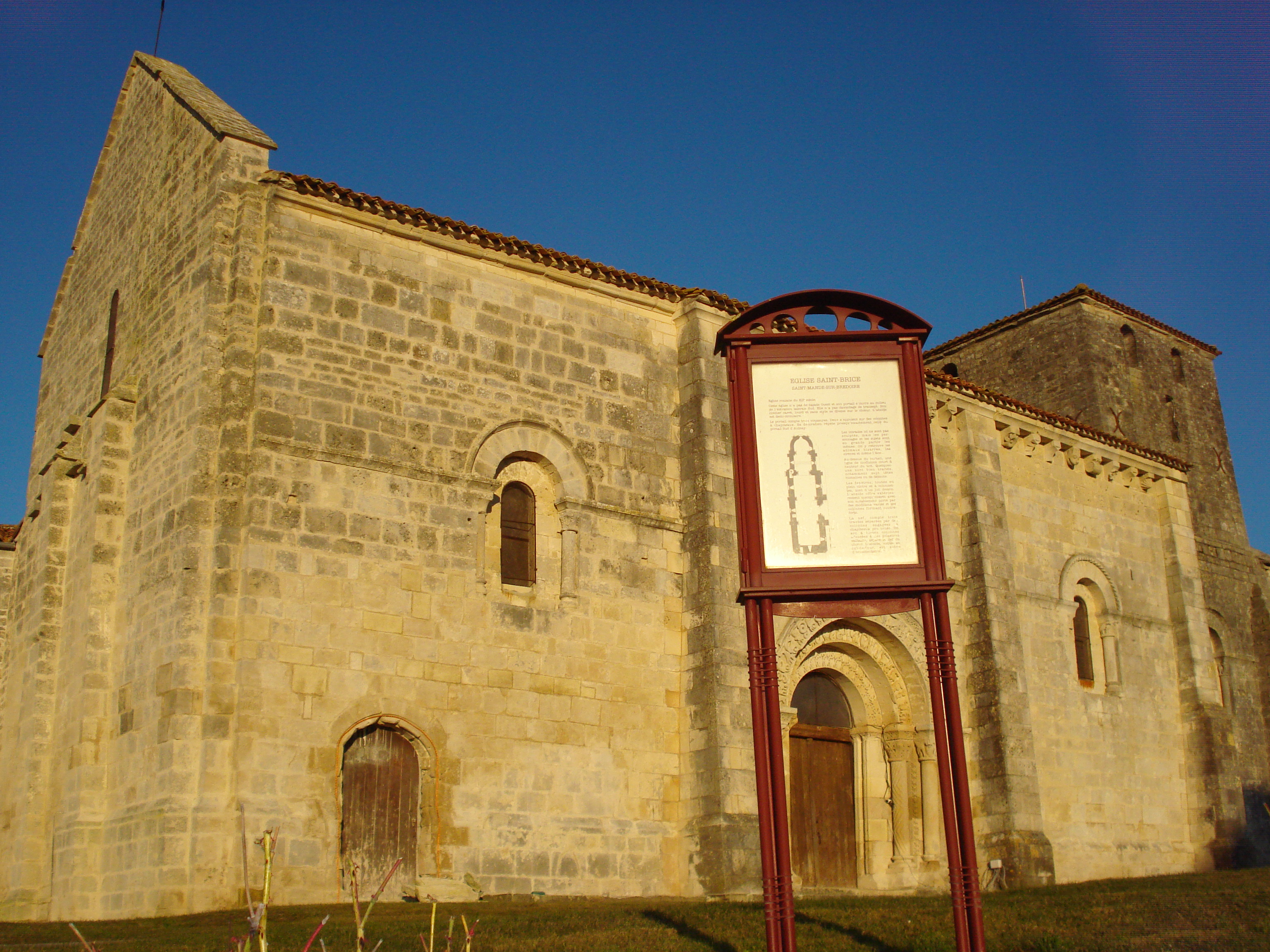
- The church in Saint-Mandé-sur-Brédoire

- Coat of arms
- Location of Saint-Mandé-sur-Brédoire
- Location within France Location within Nouvelle-Aquitaine
- Coordinates: 46°01′30″N 0°18′07″W
- Country: France
- Region: Nouvelle-Aquitaine
- Department: Charente-Maritime
- Arrondissement: Saint-Jean-d'Angély
- Canton: Matha

Government
  - Mayor (2020–2026): Annie Pérochon
- Area^{1}: 23.21 km^{2} (8.96 sq mi)
- Elevation: 87 m (285 ft)
- Highest elevation: 166 m (545 ft)
- Lowest elevation: 65 m (213 ft)
- Population (2023): 315
  - Density: 13.6/km^{2} (35.2/sq mi)
- Time zone: UTC+01:00 (CET)
  - Summer (DST): UTC+02:00 (CEST)
- INSEE/Postal code: 17358 /17470
- ^{1} French Land Register data, which excludes lakes, ponds, glaciers > 1 km^{2} (0.386 sq mi or 247 acres) and river estuaries.

Saint-Mandé-sur-Brédoire is a commune in the Charente-Maritime department in southwestern France.

== Population ==
Historical population
Year	Pop.	±% p.a.
1968	430	—
1975	403	−0.92%
1982	354	−1.83%
1990	318	−1.33%
1999	340	+0.75%
2007	316	−0.91%
2012	304	−0.77%
2017	309	+0.33%
2023	315	+0.32%
Source: INSEE

== See also ==
- Communes of the Charente-Maritime department
