= Villiers-Couture =

- Commune
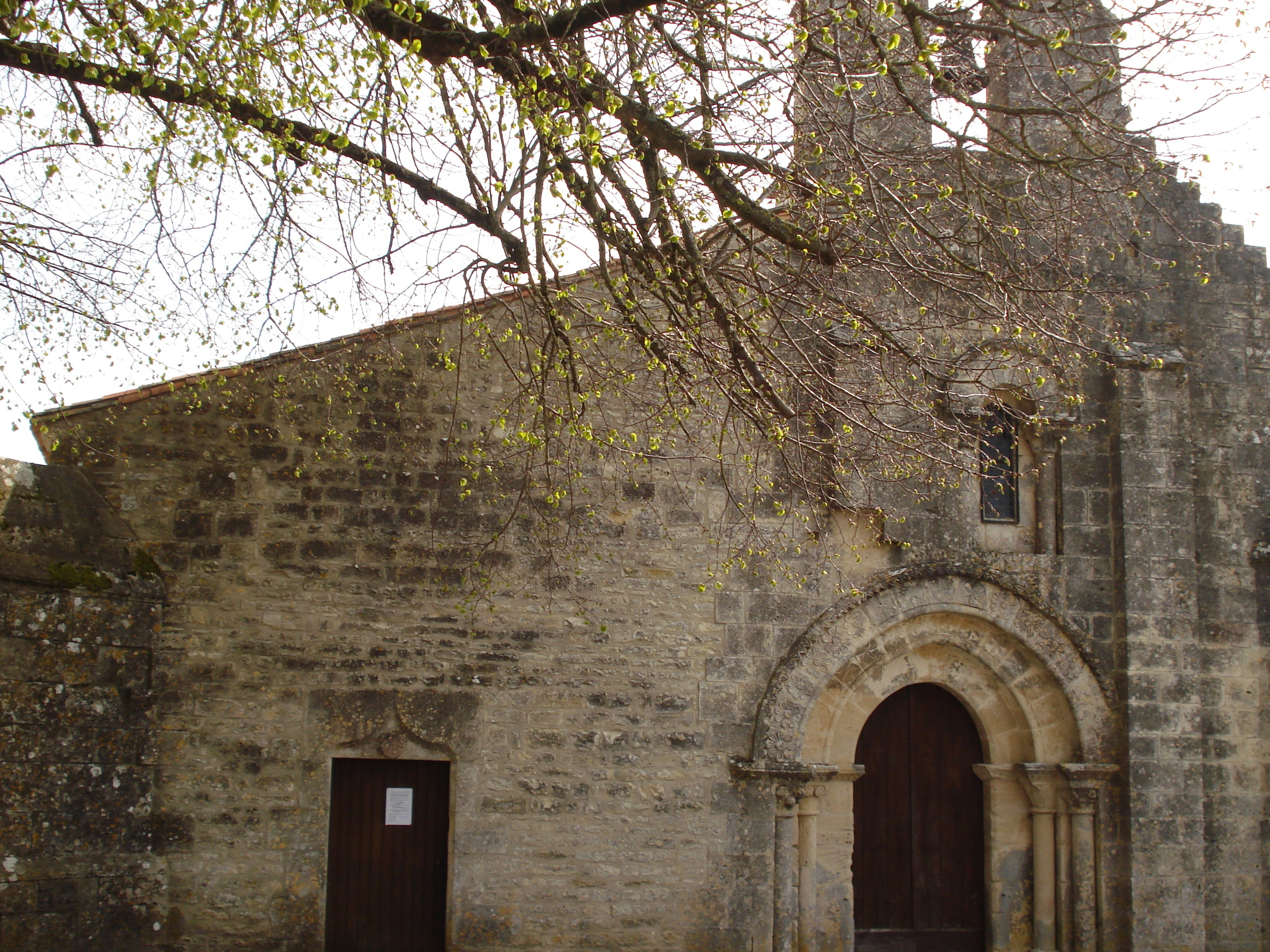
- The church in Villiers-Couture
- Location of Villiers-Couture
- Location within France Location within Nouvelle-Aquitaine
- Coordinates: 45°59′03″N 0°09′02″W
- Country: France
- Region: Nouvelle-Aquitaine
- Department: Charente-Maritime
- Arrondissement: Saint-Jean-d'Angély
- Canton: Matha

Government
  - Mayor (2020–2026): Florence Barbe
- Area^{1}: 8.37 km^{2} (3.23 sq mi)
- Highest elevation: 138 m (453 ft)
- Lowest elevation: 96 m (315 ft)
- Population (2023): 109
  - Density: 13.0/km^{2} (33.7/sq mi)
- Time zone: UTC+01:00 (CET)
  - Summer (DST): UTC+02:00 (CEST)
- INSEE/Postal code: 17477 /17510
- ^{1} French Land Register data, which excludes lakes, ponds, glaciers > 1 km^{2} (0.386 sq mi or 247 acres) and river estuaries.

Villiers-Couture (French pronunciation: [vilje kutyʁ]) is a commune in the Charente-Maritime department in southwestern France.

== Population ==
Historical population
Year	Pop.	±% p.a.
1968	171	—
1975	151	−1.76%
1982	171	+1.79%
1990	163	−0.60%
1999	168	+0.34%
2007	154	−1.08%
2012	135	−2.60%
2017	116	−2.99%
2023	109	−1.03%
Source: INSEE

== See also ==
- Communes of the Charente-Maritime department
