= Massac, Charente-Maritime =

Massac
- Commune
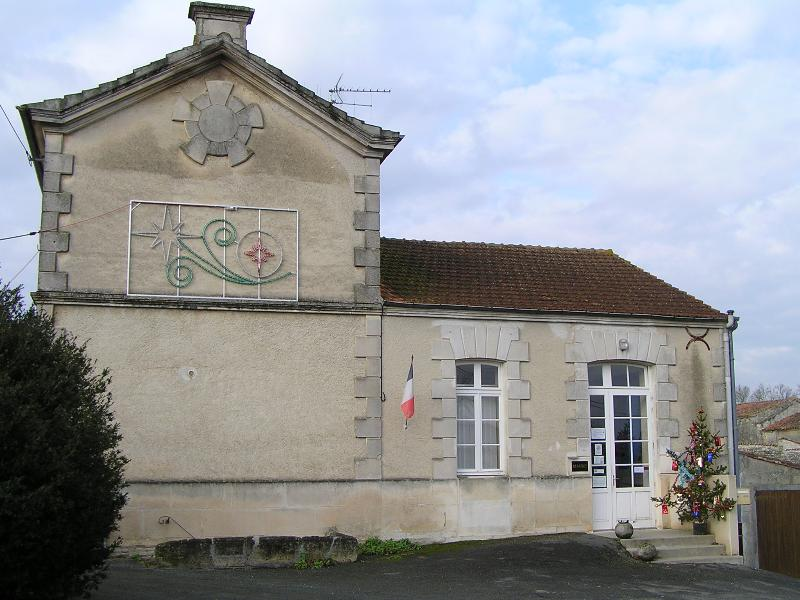
- Town hall
- Location of Massac
- Location within France Location within Nouvelle-Aquitaine
- Coordinates: 45°52′02″N 0°13′14″W
- Country: France
- Region: Nouvelle-Aquitaine
- Department: Charente-Maritime
- Arrondissement: Saint-Jean-d'Angély
- Canton: Matha

Government
  - Mayor (2020–2026): Michel Filleul
- Area^{1}: 9.15 km^{2} (3.53 sq mi)
- Elevation: 70 m (230 ft)
- Highest elevation: 109 m (358 ft)
- Lowest elevation: 56 m (184 ft)
- Population (2023): 184
  - Density: 20.1/km^{2} (52.1/sq mi)
- Time zone: UTC+01:00 (CET)
  - Summer (DST): UTC+02:00 (CEST)
- INSEE/Postal code: 17223 /17490
- ^{1} French Land Register data, which excludes lakes, ponds, glaciers > 1 km^{2} (0.386 sq mi or 247 acres) and river estuaries.

Massac (French pronunciation: [masak]) is a commune in the Charente-Maritime department in southwestern France.

== Population ==
Historical population
| Year | Pop. | ±% p.a. |
|---|---|---|
| 1968 | 215 | — |
| 1975 | 209 | −0.40% |
| 1982 | 193 | −1.13% |
| 1990 | 194 | +0.06% |
| 1999 | 187 | −0.41% |
| 2007 | 176 | −0.75% |
| 2012 | 158 | −2.13% |
| 2017 | 175 | +2.06% |
| 2023 | 184 | +0.84% |
Source: INSEE

== See also ==
- Communes of the Charente-Maritime department
