= Seigné =

- Commune
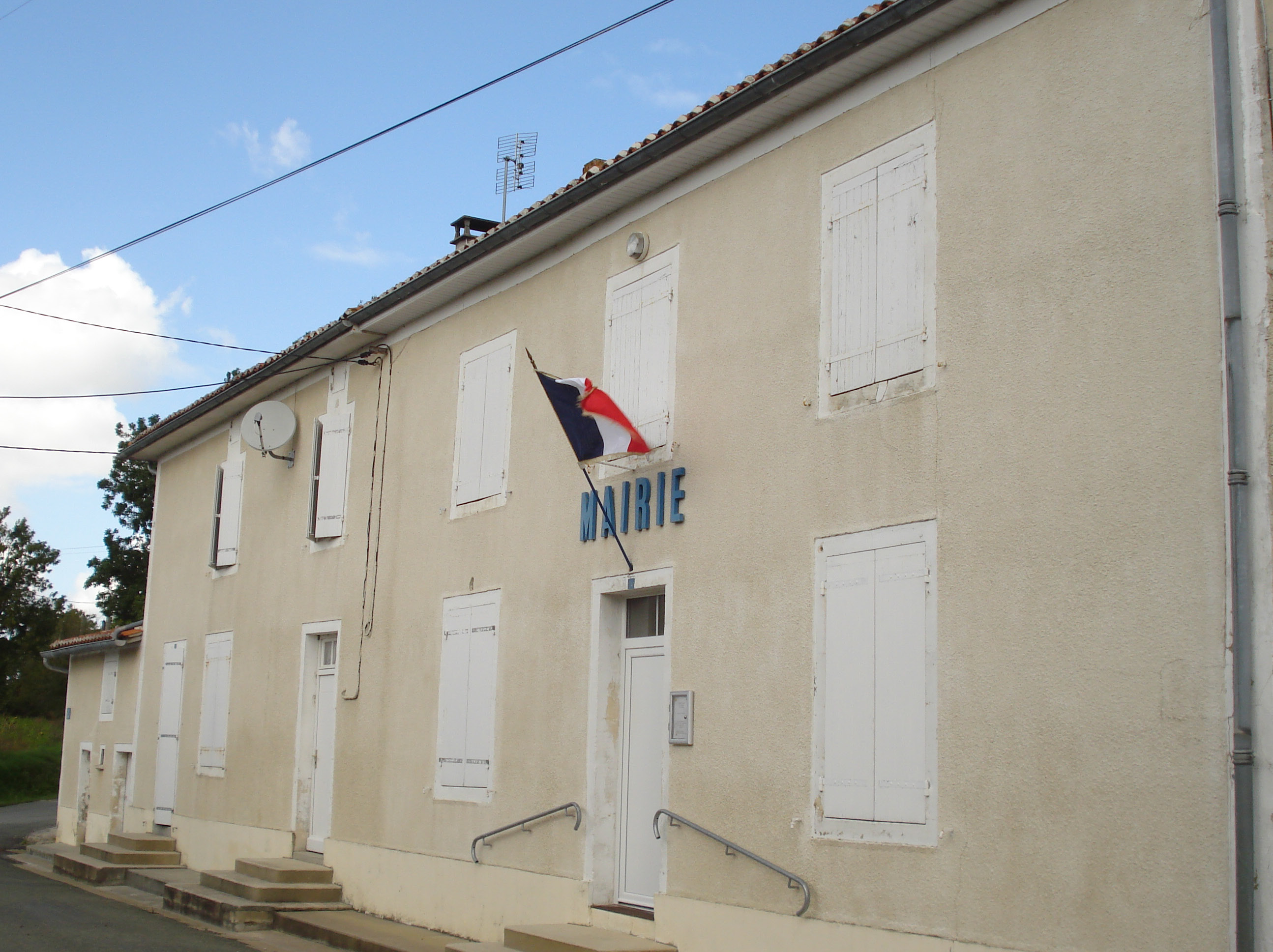
- The town hall in Seigné
- Location of Seigné
- Location within France Location within Nouvelle-Aquitaine
- Coordinates: 45°57′09″N 0°12′38″W
- Country: France
- Region: Nouvelle-Aquitaine
- Department: Charente-Maritime
- Arrondissement: Saint-Jean-d'Angély
- Canton: Matha
- Intercommunality: Vals de Saintonge

Government
  - Mayor (2020–2026): Patrick Reveillaud
- Area^{1}: 6.43 km^{2} (2.48 sq mi)
- Highest elevation: 134 m (440 ft)
- Lowest elevation: 68 m (223 ft)
- Population (2023): 92
  - Density: 14/km^{2} (37/sq mi)
- Time zone: UTC+01:00 (CET)
  - Summer (DST): UTC+02:00 (CEST)
- INSEE/Postal code: 17422 /17510
- ^{1} French Land Register data, which excludes lakes, ponds, glaciers > 1 km^{2} (0.386 sq mi or 247 acres) and river estuaries.

Seigné (French pronunciation: [sɛɲe]) is a commune in the Charente-Maritime department in southwestern France.

== Population ==
Historical population
Year	Pop.	±% p.a.
1968	155	—
1975	140	−1.44%
1982	124	−1.72%
1990	117	−0.72%
1999	108	−0.89%
2007	102	−0.71%
2012	94	−1.62%
2017	77	−3.91%
2023	92	+3.01%
Source: INSEE

== See also ==
- Communes of the Charente-Maritime department
