= Romazières =

- Commune
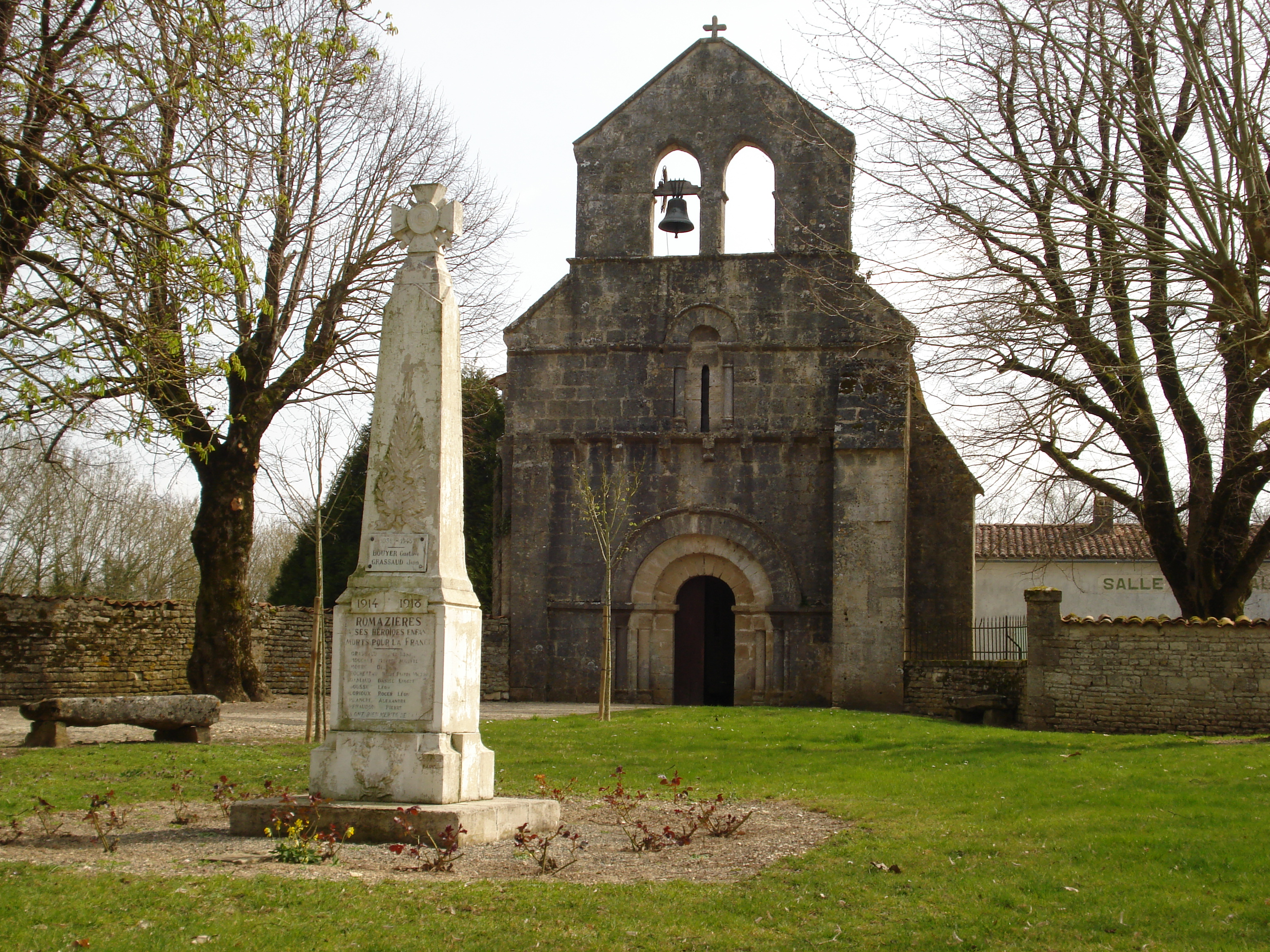
- The church in Romazières
- Location of Romazières
- Location within France Location within Nouvelle-Aquitaine
- Coordinates: 45°59′33″N 0°10′28″W
- Country: France
- Region: Nouvelle-Aquitaine
- Department: Charente-Maritime
- Arrondissement: Saint-Jean-d'Angély
- Canton: Matha

Government
  - Mayor (2020–2026): André Leclere
- Area^{1}: 8.7 km^{2} (3.4 sq mi)
- Highest elevation: 144 m (472 ft)
- Lowest elevation: 104 m (341 ft)
- Population (2023): 90
  - Density: 10/km^{2} (27/sq mi)
- Time zone: UTC+01:00 (CET)
  - Summer (DST): UTC+02:00 (CEST)
- INSEE/Postal code: 17301 /17510
- ^{1} French Land Register data, which excludes lakes, ponds, glaciers > 1 km^{2} (0.386 sq mi or 247 acres) and river estuaries.

Romazières (French pronunciation: [ʁɔmazjɛʁ]) is a commune in the Charente-Maritime department in southwestern France.

== Population ==
Historical population
Year	Pop.	±% p.a.
1968	138	—
1975	128	−1.07%
1982	102	−3.19%
1990	99	−0.37%
1999	80	−2.34%
2007	66	−2.38%
2012	74	+2.31%
2017	71	−0.82%
2023	90	+4.03%
Source: INSEE

== See also ==
- Communes of the Charente-Maritime department
