= Courcerac =

- Commune
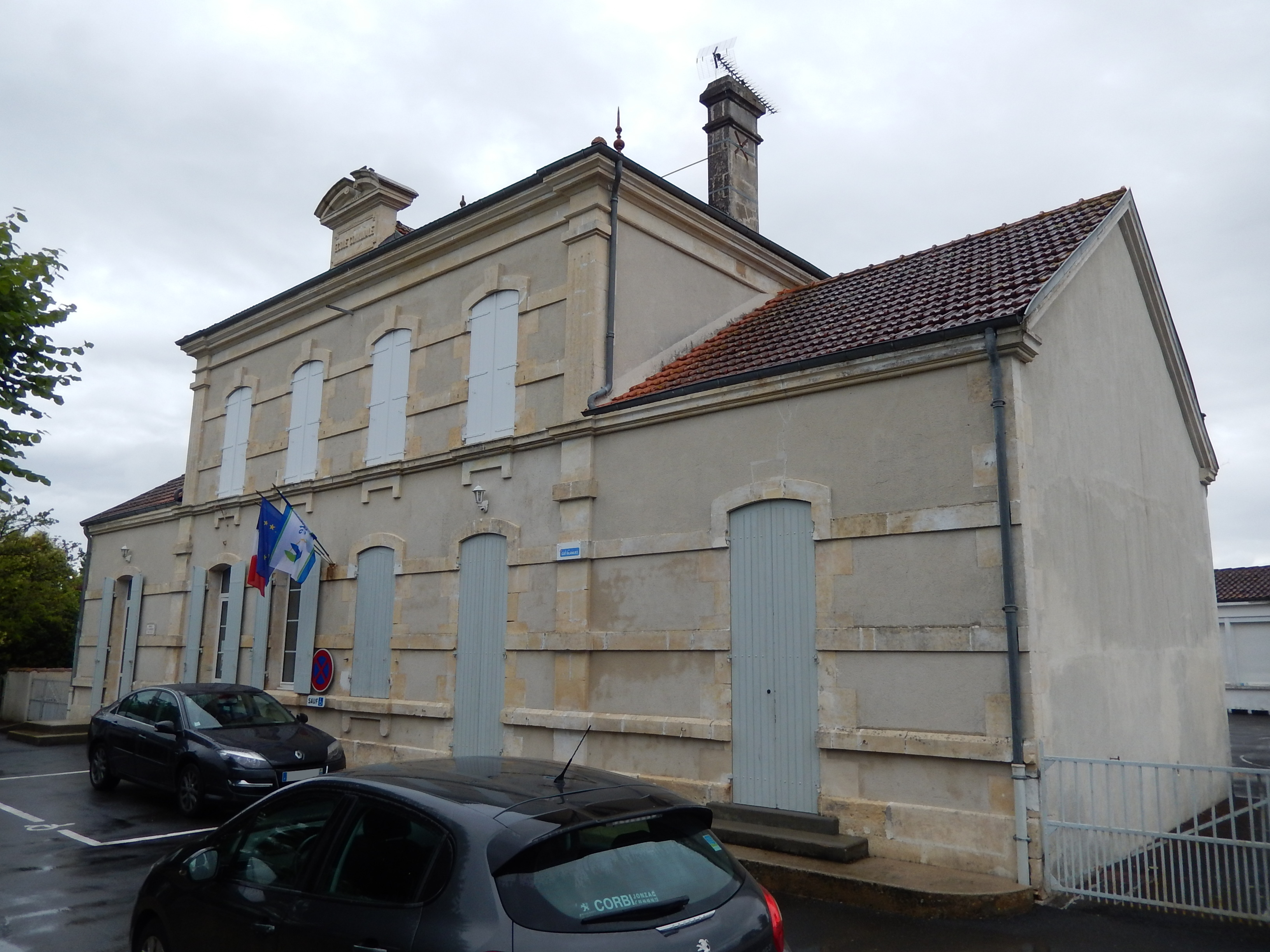
- The town hall in Courcerac
- Location of Courcerac
- Location within France Location within Nouvelle-Aquitaine
- Coordinates: 45°50′33″N 0°21′50″W
- Country: France
- Region: Nouvelle-Aquitaine
- Department: Charente-Maritime
- Arrondissement: Saint-Jean-d'Angély
- Canton: Matha

Government
  - Mayor (2020–2026): Gérard Lamiraud
- Area^{1}: 6.2 km^{2} (2.4 sq mi)
- Elevation: 18 m (59 ft)
- Highest elevation: 37 m (121 ft)
- Lowest elevation: 16 m (52 ft)
- Population (2023): 316
  - Density: 51/km^{2} (130/sq mi)
- Time zone: UTC+01:00 (CET)
  - Summer (DST): UTC+02:00 (CEST)
- INSEE/Postal code: 17126 /17160
- ^{1} French Land Register data, which excludes lakes, ponds, glaciers > 1 km^{2} (0.386 sq mi or 247 acres) and river estuaries.

Courcerac (French pronunciation: [kuʁsəʁak]) is a commune in the Charente-Maritime department in southwestern France.

== Population ==
Historical population
| Year | Pop. | ±% p.a. |
|---|---|---|
| 1968 | 244 | — |
| 1975 | 270 | +1.46% |
| 1982 | 274 | +0.21% |
| 1990 | 262 | −0.56% |
| 1999 | 254 | −0.34% |
| 2007 | 278 | +1.13% |
| 2012 | 306 | +1.94% |
| 2017 | 296 | −0.66% |
| 2023 | 316 | +1.10% |
Source: INSEE

== See also ==
- Communes of the Charente-Maritime department
