= Les Éduts =

- Commune
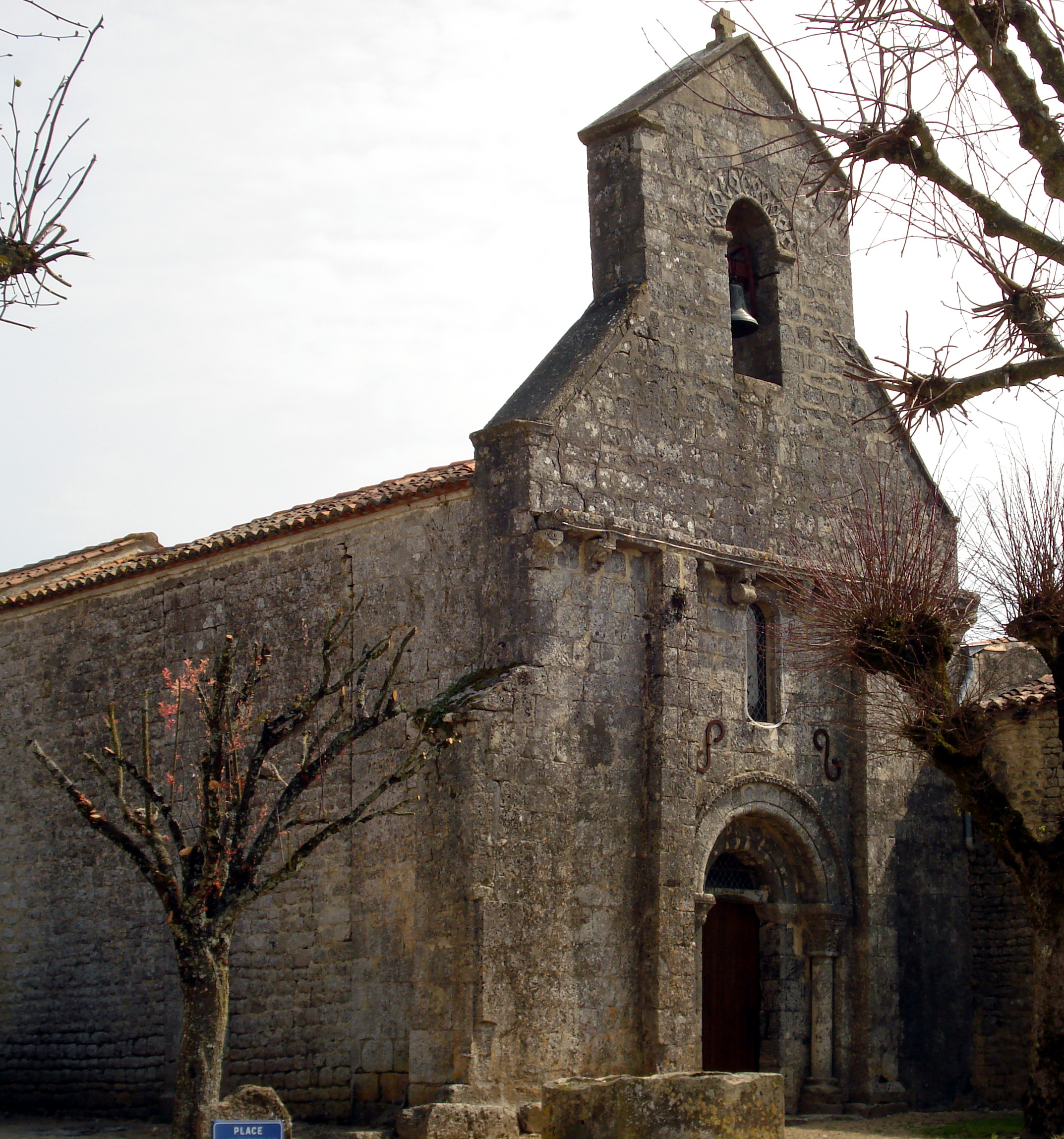
- The church in Les Éduts
- Location of Les Éduts
- Location within France Location within Nouvelle-Aquitaine
- Coordinates: 45°59′32″N 0°12′55″W
- Country: France
- Region: Nouvelle-Aquitaine
- Department: Charente-Maritime
- Arrondissement: Saint-Jean-d'Angély
- Canton: Matha
- Intercommunality: Vals de Saintonge

Government
  - Mayor (2020–2026): Françoise Guéret
- Area^{1}: 8.05 km^{2} (3.11 sq mi)
- Highest elevation: 156 m (512 ft)
- Lowest elevation: 105 m (344 ft)
- Population (2023): 57
  - Density: 7.1/km^{2} (18/sq mi)
- Time zone: UTC+01:00 (CET)
  - Summer (DST): UTC+02:00 (CEST)
- INSEE/Postal code: 17149 /17510
- ^{1} French Land Register data, which excludes lakes, ponds, glaciers > 1 km^{2} (0.386 sq mi or 247 acres) and river estuaries.

Les Éduts (French pronunciation: [le.z‿edy]) is a commune in the Charente-Maritime department in southwestern France.

== Population ==
Historical population
Year	Pop.	±% p.a.
1968	83	—
1975	70	−2.40%
1982	81	+2.11%
1990	82	+0.15%
1999	64	−2.72%
2007	66	+0.39%
2012	67	+0.30%
2017	62	−1.54%
2023	57	−1.39%
Source: INSEE

== See also ==
- Communes of the Charente-Maritime department
