= Gourvillette =

- Commune
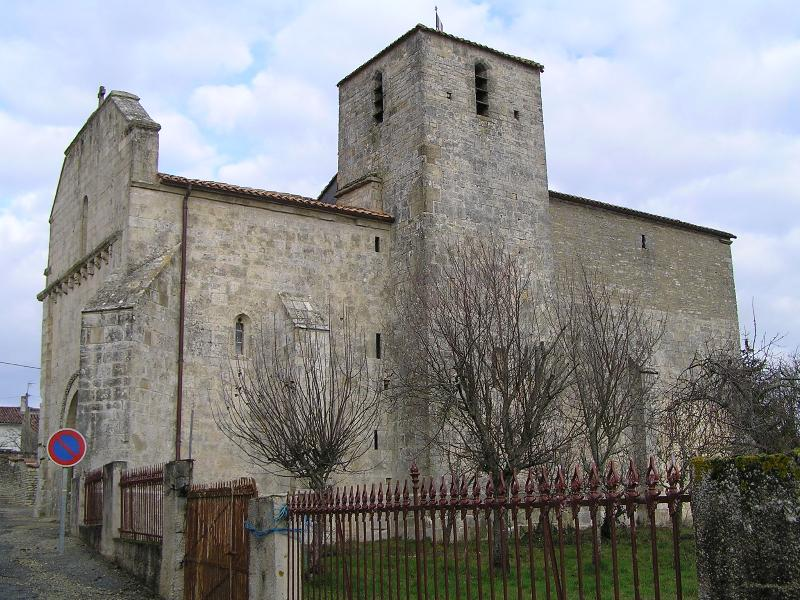
- The church in Gourvillette

- Coat of arms
- Location of Gourvillette
- Location within France Location within Nouvelle-Aquitaine
- Coordinates: 45°53′28″N 0°13′16″W
- Country: France
- Region: Nouvelle-Aquitaine
- Department: Charente-Maritime
- Arrondissement: Saint-Jean-d'Angély
- Canton: Matha

Government
  - Mayor (2020–2026): Jean-Paul Augustin
- Area^{1}: 8.01 km^{2} (3.09 sq mi)
- Elevation: 96 m (315 ft)
- Highest elevation: 119 m (390 ft)
- Lowest elevation: 65 m (213 ft)
- Population (2023): 116
  - Density: 14.5/km^{2} (37.5/sq mi)
- Time zone: UTC+01:00 (CET)
  - Summer (DST): UTC+02:00 (CEST)
- INSEE/Postal code: 17180 /17490
- ^{1} French Land Register data, which excludes lakes, ponds, glaciers > 1 km^{2} (0.386 sq mi or 247 acres) and river estuaries.

Gourvillette (French pronunciation: [ɡuʁvilɛt]) is a commune in the Charente-Maritime department in southwestern France.

== Population ==
Historical population
| Year | Pop. | ±% p.a. |
|---|---|---|
| 1968 | 185 | — |
| 1975 | 188 | +0.23% |
| 1982 | 166 | −1.76% |
| 1990 | 132 | −2.82% |
| 1999 | 104 | −2.61% |
| 2007 | 106 | +0.24% |
| 2012 | 105 | −0.19% |
| 2017 | 89 | −3.25% |
| 2023 | 116 | +4.51% |
Source: INSEE

== See also ==
- Communes of the Charente-Maritime department
