= Louzignac =

- Commune
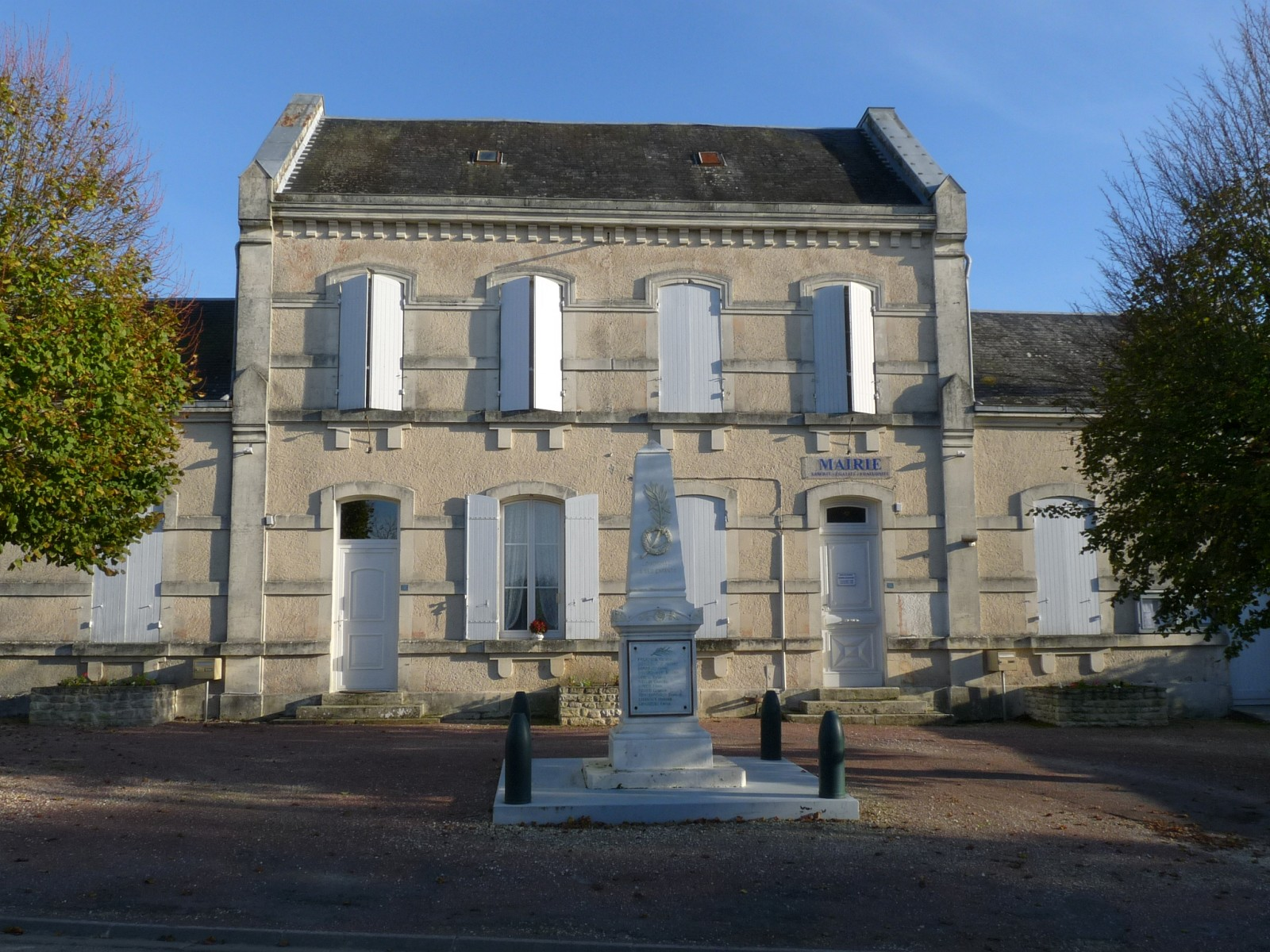
- The town hall in Louzignac
- Location of Louzignac
- Location within France Location within Nouvelle-Aquitaine
- Coordinates: 45°50′12″N 0°14′11″W
- Country: France
- Region: Nouvelle-Aquitaine
- Department: Charente-Maritime
- Arrondissement: Saint-Jean-d'Angély
- Canton: Matha

Government
  - Mayor (2020–2026): Daniel Dardillat
- Area^{1}: 6.13 km^{2} (2.37 sq mi)
- Elevation: 58 m (190 ft)
- Highest elevation: 80 m (260 ft)
- Lowest elevation: 49 m (161 ft)
- Population (2023): 176
  - Density: 28.7/km^{2} (74.4/sq mi)
- Time zone: UTC+01:00 (CET)
  - Summer (DST): UTC+02:00 (CEST)
- INSEE/Postal code: 17212 /17160
- ^{1} French Land Register data, which excludes lakes, ponds, glaciers > 1 km^{2} (0.386 sq mi or 247 acres) and river estuaries.

Louzignac (French pronunciation: [luziɲak]) is a commune in the Charente-Maritime department in southwestern France.

== Population ==
Historical population
Year	Pop.	±% p.a.
1968	196	—
1975	171	−1.93%
1982	158	−1.12%
1990	166	+0.62%
1999	149	−1.19%
2007	169	+1.59%
2012	153	−1.97%
2017	160	+0.90%
2023	176	+1.60%
Source: INSEE

== See also ==
- Communes of the Charente-Maritime department
