= Villemorin =

- Commune
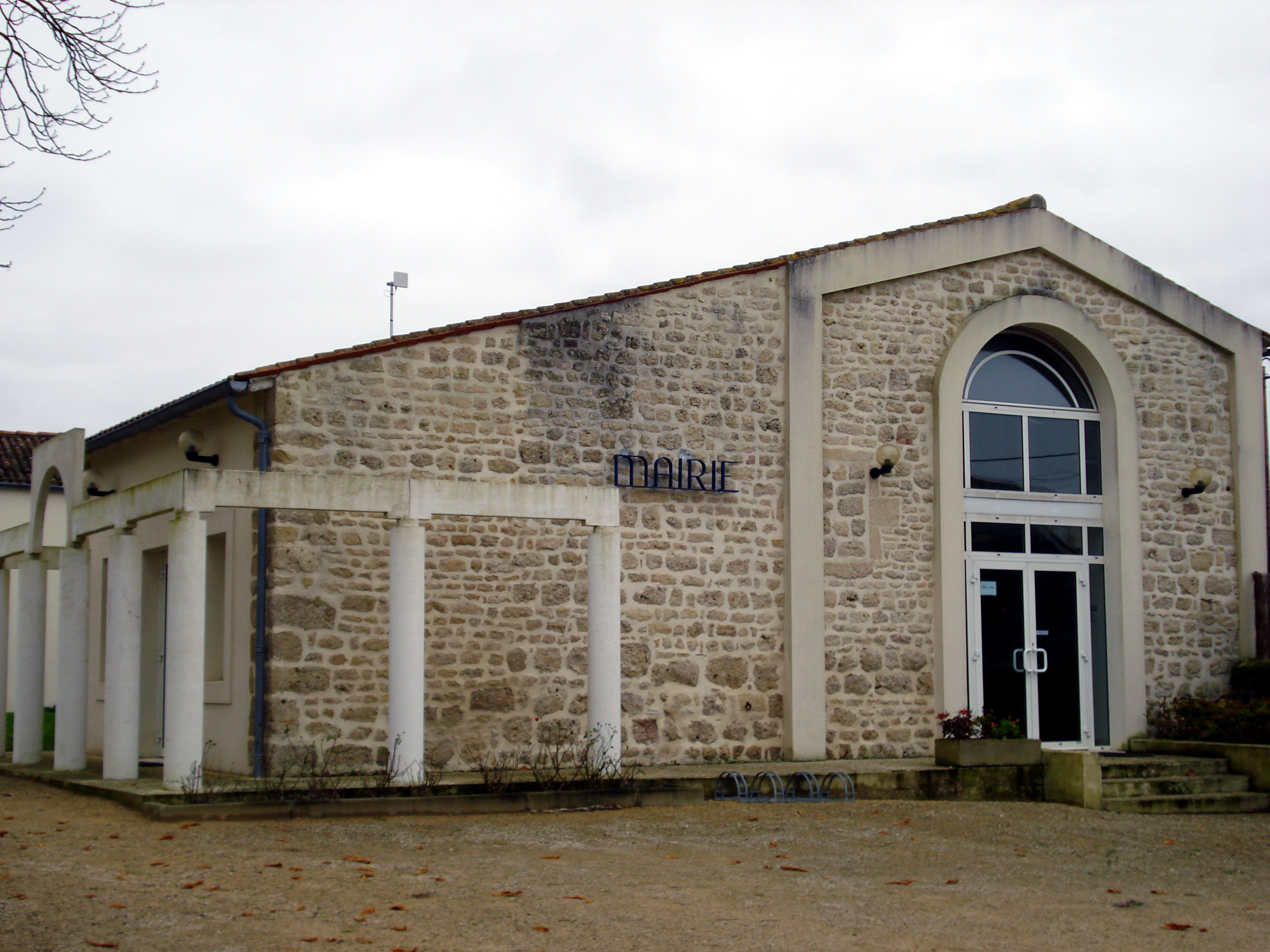
- The town hall in Villemorin

- Coat of arms
- Location of Villemorin
- Location within France Location within Nouvelle-Aquitaine
- Coordinates: 46°00′14″N 0°17′49″W
- Country: France
- Region: Nouvelle-Aquitaine
- Department: Charente-Maritime
- Arrondissement: Saint-Jean-d'Angély
- Canton: Matha

Government
  - Mayor (2020–2026): Bernard Caillaud
- Area^{1}: 10.67 km^{2} (4.12 sq mi)
- Highest elevation: 101 m (331 ft)
- Lowest elevation: 48 m (157 ft)
- Population (2023): 130
  - Density: 12/km^{2} (32/sq mi)
- Time zone: UTC+01:00 (CET)
  - Summer (DST): UTC+02:00 (CEST)
- INSEE/Postal code: 17473 /17470
- ^{1} French Land Register data, which excludes lakes, ponds, glaciers > 1 km^{2} (0.386 sq mi or 247 acres) and river estuaries.

Villemorin (French pronunciation: [vilmɔʁɛ̃]) is a commune in the Charente-Maritime department in southwestern France.

== Population ==
Historical population
| Year | Pop. | ±% p.a. |
|---|---|---|
| 1968 | 175 | — |
| 1975 | 159 | −1.36% |
| 1982 | 157 | −0.18% |
| 1990 | 155 | −0.16% |
| 1999 | 142 | −0.97% |
| 2007 | 120 | −2.08% |
| 2012 | 94 | −4.77% |
| 2017 | 97 | +0.63% |
| 2023 | 130 | +5.00% |
Source: INSEE

== See also ==
- Communes of the Charente-Maritime department
