= Loiré-sur-Nie =

- Commune
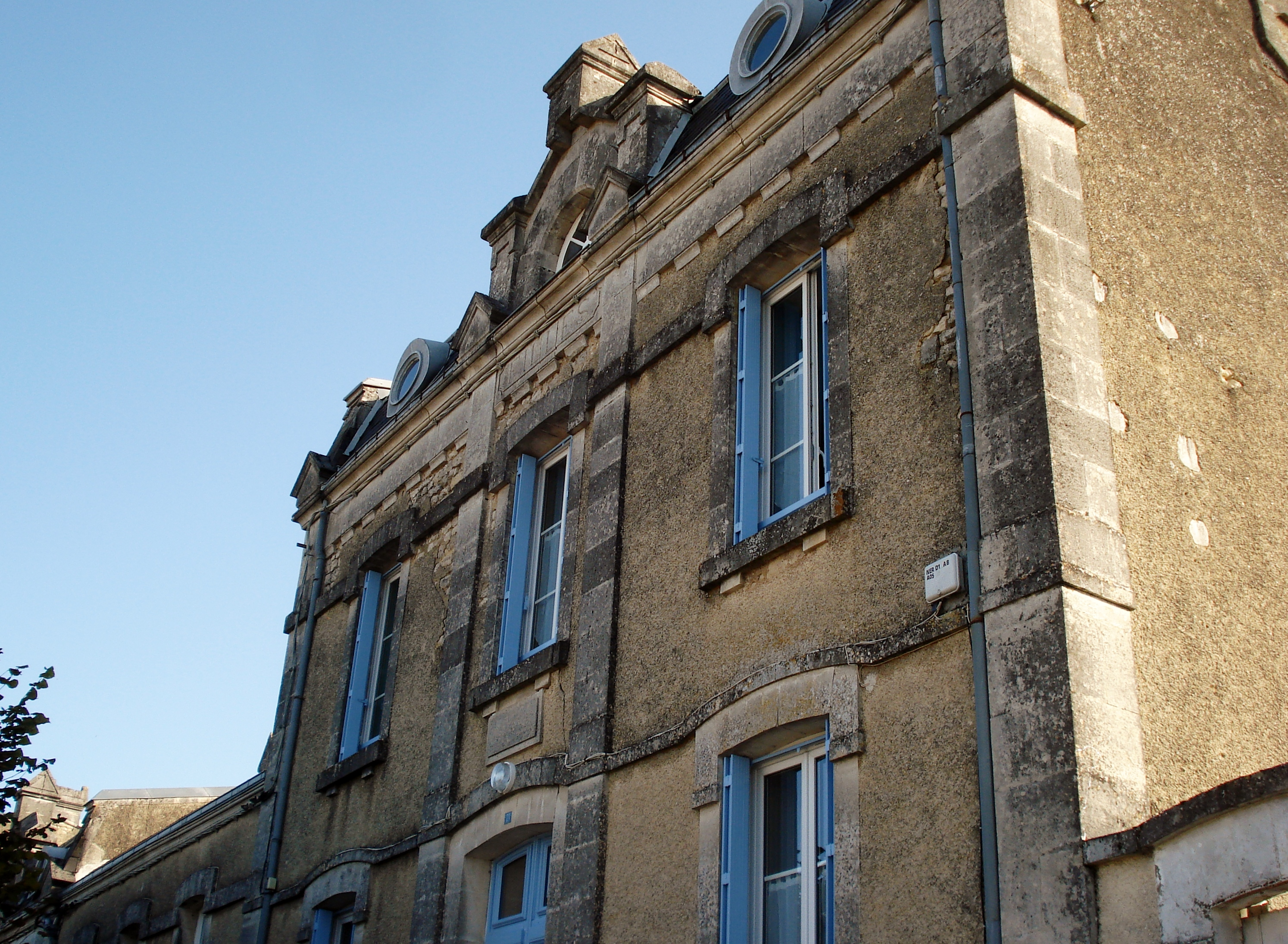
- The town hall in Loiré-sur-Nie
- Location of Loiré-sur-Nie
- Location within France Location within Nouvelle-Aquitaine
- Coordinates: 45°57′09″N 0°16′59″W
- Country: France
- Region: Nouvelle-Aquitaine
- Department: Charente-Maritime
- Arrondissement: Saint-Jean-d'Angély
- Canton: Matha

Government
  - Mayor (2020–2026): Jean-Michel Henri
- Area^{1}: 14.40 km^{2} (5.56 sq mi)
- Highest elevation: 110 m (360 ft)
- Lowest elevation: 60 m (200 ft)
- Population (2023): 283
  - Density: 19.7/km^{2} (50.9/sq mi)
- Time zone: UTC+01:00 (CET)
  - Summer (DST): UTC+02:00 (CEST)
- INSEE/Postal code: 17206 /17470
- ^{1} French Land Register data, which excludes lakes, ponds, glaciers > 1 km^{2} (0.386 sq mi or 247 acres) and river estuaries.

Loiré-sur-Nie (French pronunciation: [lwaʁe syʁ ni]) is a commune in the Charente-Maritime department in southwestern France.

== Population ==
Historical population
| Year | Pop. | ±% p.a. |
|---|---|---|
| 1968 | 442 | — |
| 1975 | 407 | −1.17% |
| 1982 | 365 | −1.54% |
| 1990 | 340 | −0.88% |
| 1999 | 290 | −1.75% |
| 2007 | 291 | +0.04% |
| 2012 | 301 | +0.68% |
| 2017 | 284 | −1.16% |
| 2023 | 283 | −0.06% |
Source: INSEE

== See also ==
- Communes of the Charente-Maritime department
