= Vinax =

- Commune
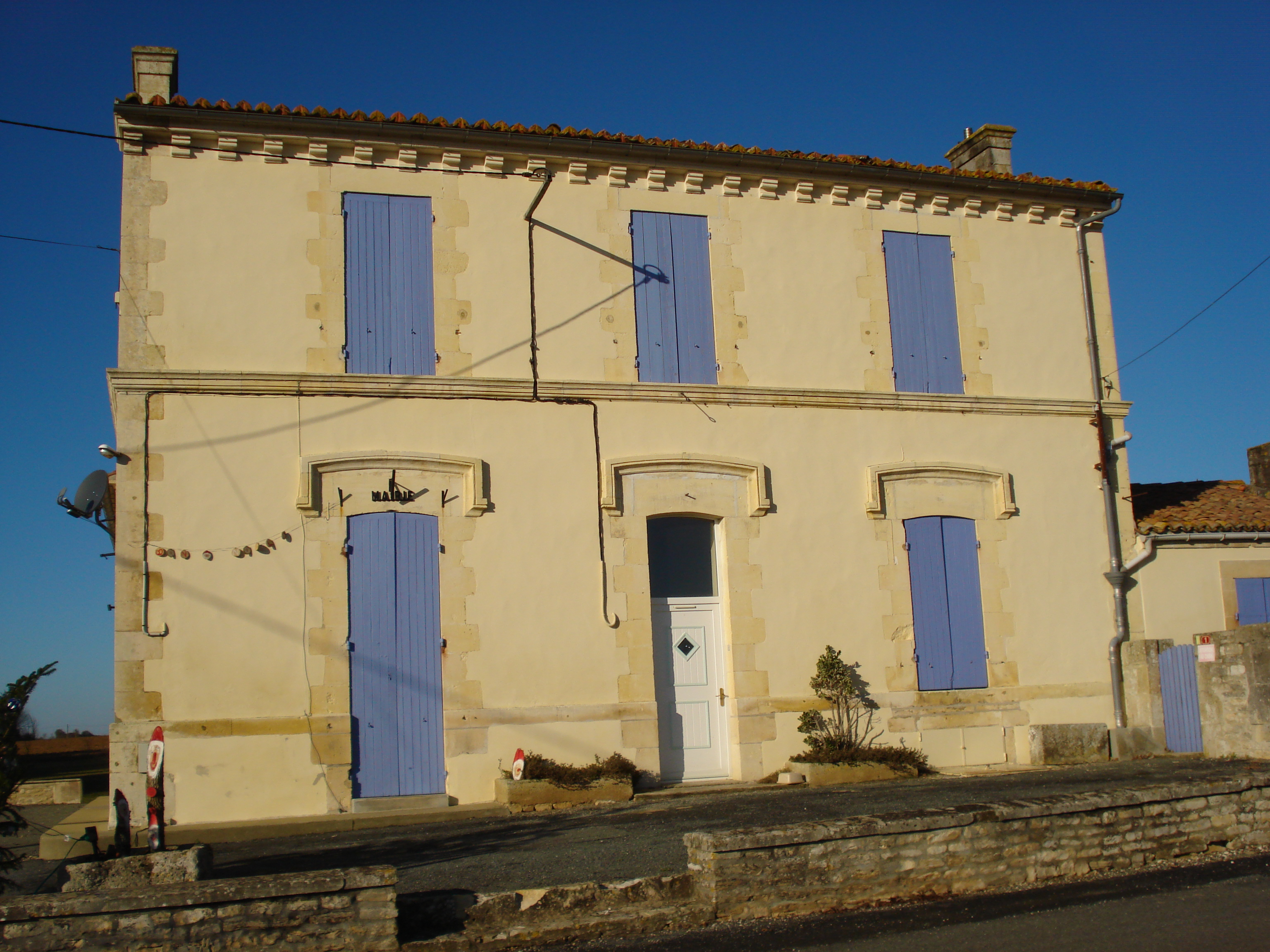
- The town hall in Vinax
- Location of Vinax
- Location within France Location within Nouvelle-Aquitaine
- Coordinates: 46°02′20″N 0°12′21″W
- Country: France
- Region: Nouvelle-Aquitaine
- Department: Charente-Maritime
- Arrondissement: Saint-Jean-d'Angély
- Canton: Matha

Government
  - Mayor (2020–2026): Nadège Guillet
- Area^{1}: 9.19 km^{2} (3.55 sq mi)
- Highest elevation: 166 m (545 ft)
- Lowest elevation: 123 m (404 ft)
- Population (2023): 68
  - Density: 7.4/km^{2} (19/sq mi)
- Time zone: UTC+01:00 (CET)
  - Summer (DST): UTC+02:00 (CEST)
- INSEE/Postal code: 17478 /17510
- ^{1} French Land Register data, which excludes lakes, ponds, glaciers > 1 km^{2} (0.386 sq mi or 247 acres) and river estuaries.

Vinax is a commune in the Charente-Maritime department in southwestern France.

== Population ==
Historical population
Year	Pop.	±% p.a.
1968	128	—
1975	108	−2.40%
1982	81	−4.03%
1990	58	−4.09%
1999	62	+0.74%
2007	61	−0.20%
2012	66	+1.59%
2017	61	−1.56%
2023	68	+1.83%
Source: INSEE

== See also ==
- Communes of the Charente-Maritime department
