= Les Touches-de-Périgny =

- Commune
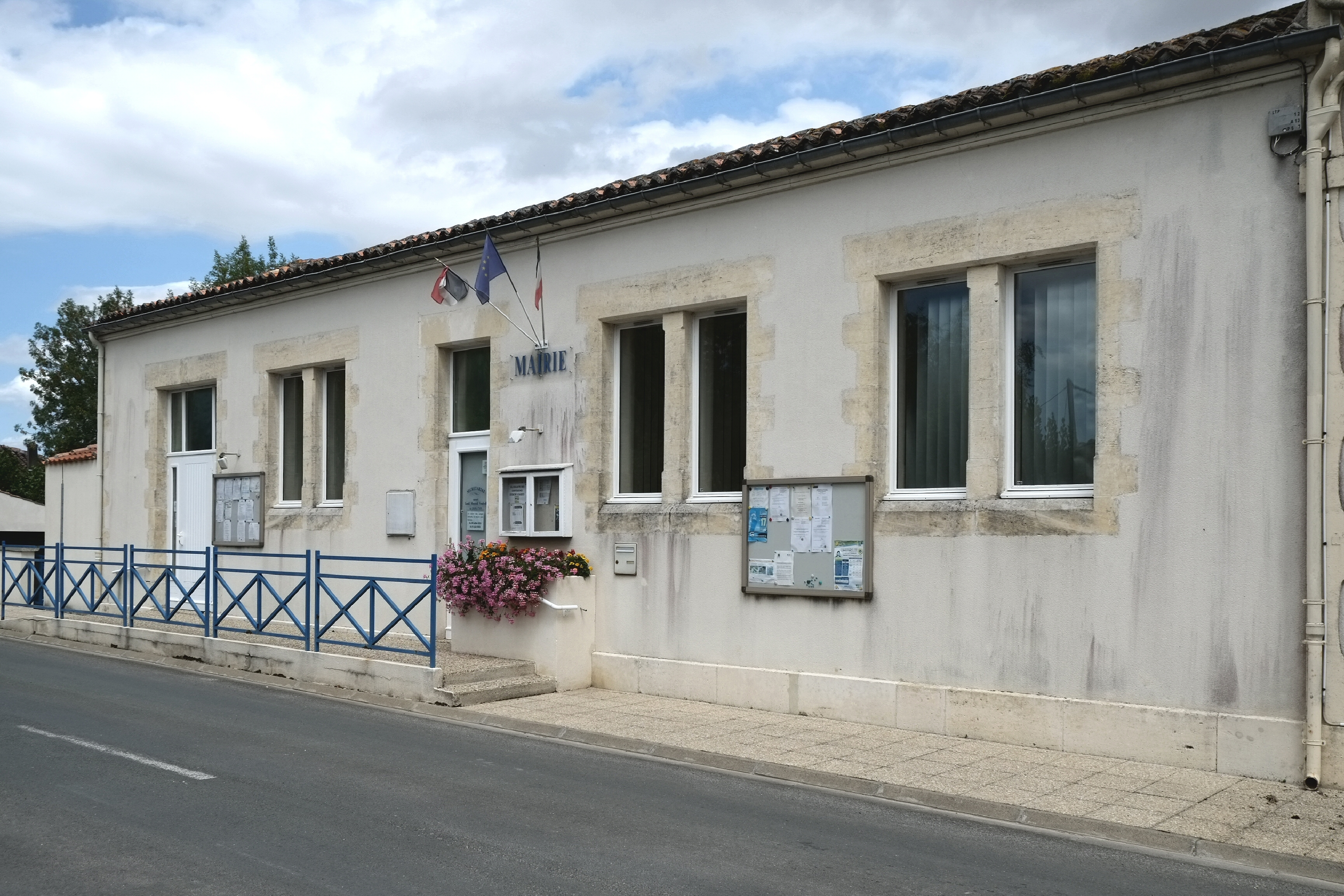
- The town hall in Les Touches-de-Périgny
- Location of Les Touches-de-Périgny
- Location within France Location within Nouvelle-Aquitaine
- Coordinates: 45°54′31″N 0°16′02″W
- Country: France
- Region: Nouvelle-Aquitaine
- Department: Charente-Maritime
- Arrondissement: Saint-Jean-d'Angély
- Canton: Matha

Government
  - Mayor (2020–2026): Joël Wiciak
- Area^{1}: 21.56 km^{2} (8.32 sq mi)
- Elevation: 85 m (279 ft)
- Highest elevation: 107 m (351 ft)
- Lowest elevation: 46 m (151 ft)
- Population (2023): 550
  - Density: 26/km^{2} (66/sq mi)
- Time zone: UTC+01:00 (CET)
  - Summer (DST): UTC+02:00 (CEST)
- INSEE/Postal code: 17451 /17160
- ^{1} French Land Register data, which excludes lakes, ponds, glaciers > 1 km^{2} (0.386 sq mi or 247 acres) and river estuaries.

Les Touches-de-Périgny (French pronunciation: [le tuʃ də peʁiɲi]) is a commune in the Charente-Maritime department in southwestern France.

== Population ==
Historical population
Year	Pop.	±% p.a.
1968	643	—
1975	578	−1.51%
1982	523	−1.42%
1990	474	−1.22%
1999	494	+0.46%
2007	537	+1.05%
2012	560	+0.84%
2017	568	+0.28%
2023	550	−0.54%
Source: INSEE

== See also ==
- Communes of the Charente-Maritime department
