= Bazauges =

- Commune
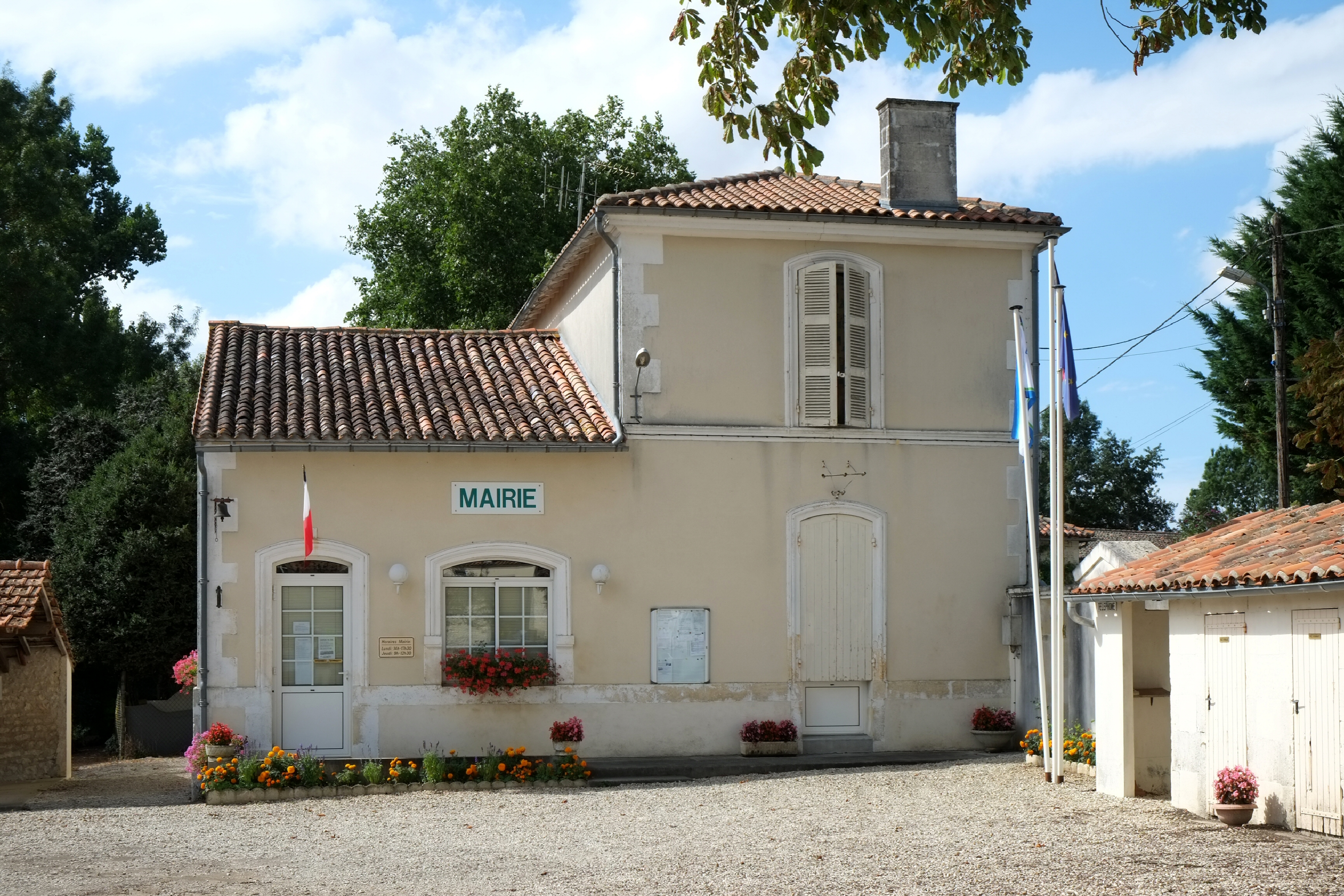
- The town hall in Bazauges
- Location of Bazauges
- Location within France Location within Nouvelle-Aquitaine
- Coordinates: 45°55′13″N 0°10′24″W
- Country: France
- Region: Nouvelle-Aquitaine
- Department: Charente-Maritime
- Arrondissement: Saint-Jean-d'Angély
- Canton: Matha

Government
  - Mayor (2020–2026): Jacques Baron
- Area^{1}: 8.28 km^{2} (3.20 sq mi)
- Elevation: 85 m (279 ft)
- Highest elevation: 131 m (430 ft)
- Lowest elevation: 75 m (246 ft)
- Population (2023): 101
  - Density: 12.2/km^{2} (31.6/sq mi)
- Time zone: UTC+01:00 (CET)
  - Summer (DST): UTC+02:00 (CEST)
- INSEE/Postal code: 17035 /17490
- ^{1} French Land Register data, which excludes lakes, ponds, glaciers > 1 km^{2} (0.386 sq mi or 247 acres) and river estuaries.

Bazauges (French pronunciation: [bazoʒ]) is a commune in the Charente-Maritime department in southwestern France.

== Population ==
Historical population
Year	Pop.	±% p.a.
1968	207	—
1975	182	−1.82%
1982	159	−1.91%
1990	148	−0.89%
1999	130	−1.43%
2007	126	−0.39%
2012	140	+2.13%
2017	117	−3.53%
2023	101	−2.42%
Source: INSEE

== See also ==
- Communes of the Charente-Maritime department
