= Contré =

- Commune
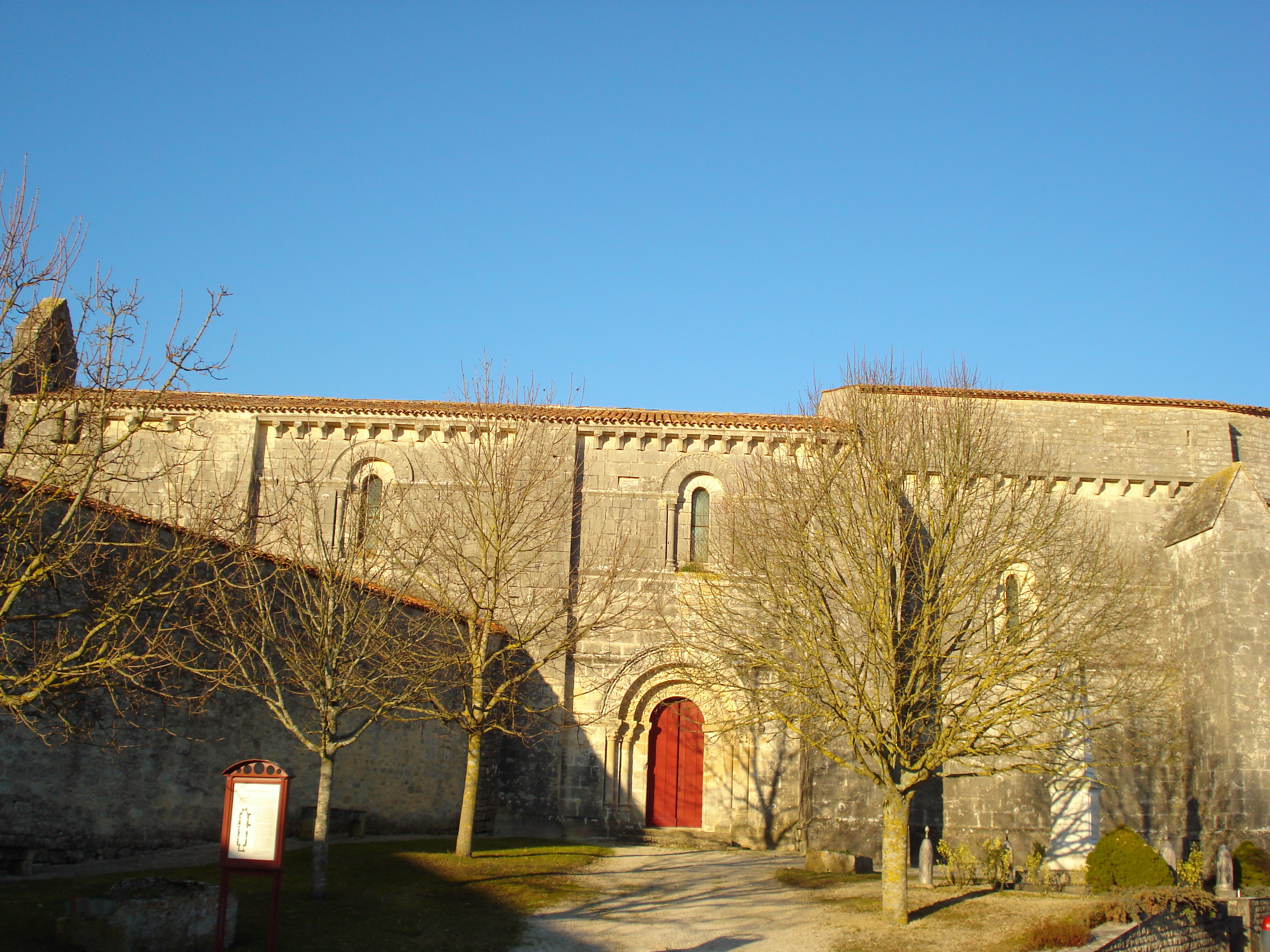
- The church in Contré
- Location of Contré
- Location within France Location within Nouvelle-Aquitaine
- Coordinates: 46°00′48″N 0°16′55″W
- Country: France
- Region: Nouvelle-Aquitaine
- Department: Charente-Maritime
- Arrondissement: Saint-Jean-d'Angély
- Canton: Matha

Government
  - Mayor (2020–2026): Jean-François Panier
- Area^{1}: 12.32 km^{2} (4.76 sq mi)
- Highest elevation: 173 m (568 ft)
- Lowest elevation: 68 m (223 ft)
- Population (2023): 135
  - Density: 11.0/km^{2} (28.4/sq mi)
- Time zone: UTC+01:00 (CET)
  - Summer (DST): UTC+02:00 (CEST)
- INSEE/Postal code: 17117 /17470
- ^{1} French Land Register data, which excludes lakes, ponds, glaciers > 1 km^{2} (0.386 sq mi or 247 acres) and river estuaries.

Contré (French pronunciation: [kɔ̃tʁe]) is a commune in the Charente-Maritime department in southwestern France.

== Population ==
Historical population
Year	Pop.	±% p.a.
1968	201	—
1975	192	−0.65%
1982	171	−1.64%
1990	165	−0.45%
1999	144	−1.50%
2007	148	+0.34%
2012	115	−4.92%
2017	145	+4.75%
2023	135	−1.18%
Source: INSEE

== See also ==
- Communes of the Charente-Maritime department
