= Gibourne =

- Commune
- Location of Gibourne
- Location within France Location within Nouvelle-Aquitaine
- Coordinates: 45°56′03″N 0°18′36″W
- Country: France
- Region: Nouvelle-Aquitaine
- Department: Charente-Maritime
- Arrondissement: Saint-Jean-d'Angély
- Canton: Matha

Government
  - Mayor (2020–2026): Emmanuelle Caiveau
- Area^{1}: 11 km^{2} (4.2 sq mi)
- Elevation: 101 m (331 ft)
- Highest elevation: 107 m (351 ft)
- Lowest elevation: 53 m (174 ft)
- Population (2023): 103
  - Density: 9.4/km^{2} (24/sq mi)
- Time zone: UTC+01:00 (CET)
  - Summer (DST): UTC+02:00 (CEST)
- INSEE/Postal code: 17176 /17160
- ^{1} French Land Register data, which excludes lakes, ponds, glaciers > 1 km^{2} (0.386 sq mi or 247 acres) and river estuaries.

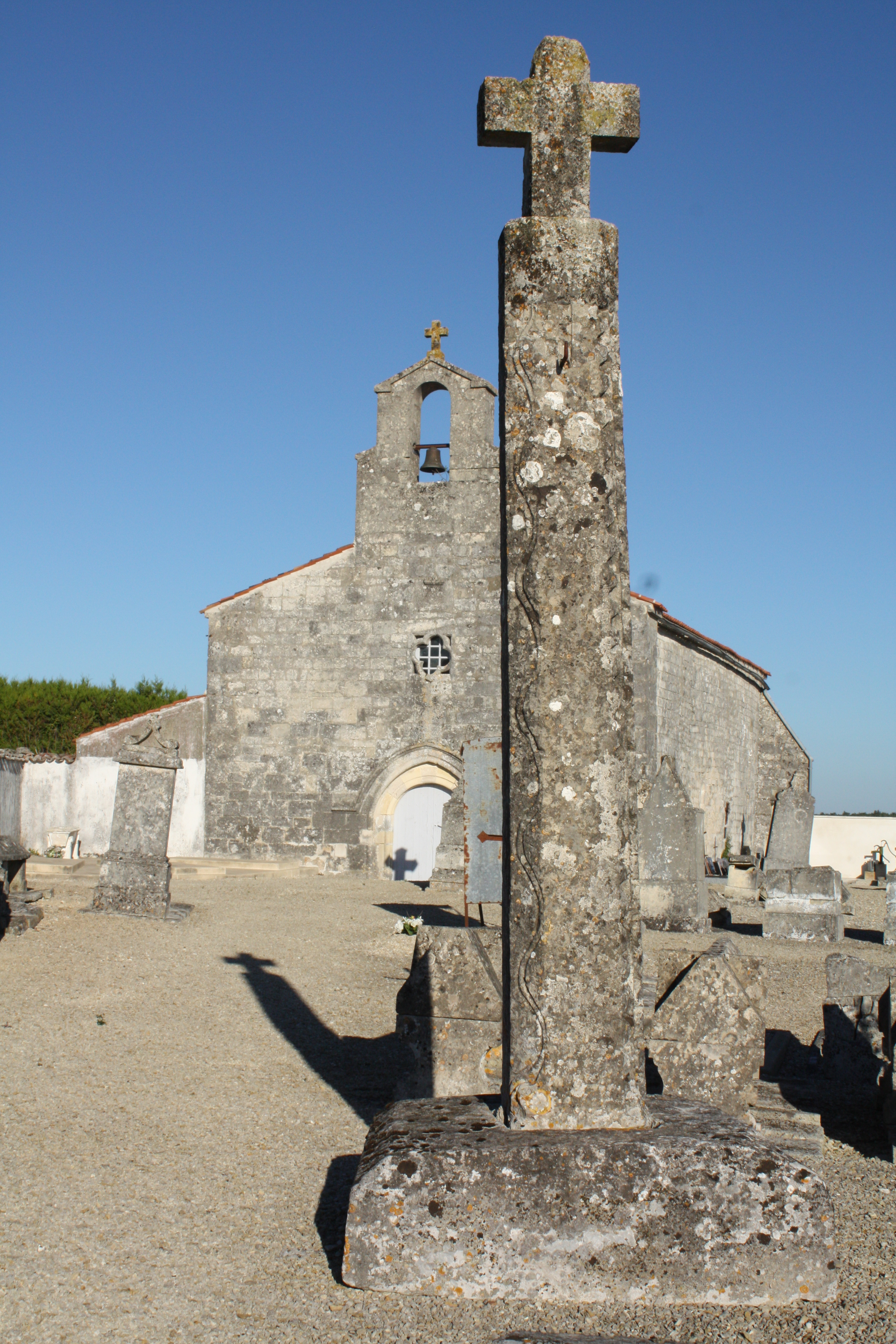
Gibourne

Gibourne (French pronunciation: [ʒibuʁn]) is a commune in the Charente-Maritime department in southwestern France.

== Population ==
Historical population
Year	Pop.	±% p.a.
1968	168	—
1975	157	−0.96%
1982	138	−1.83%
1990	138	+0.00%
1999	118	−1.72%
2007	121	+0.31%
2012	118	−0.50%
2017	112	−1.04%
2023	103	−1.39%
Source: INSEE

== See also ==
- Communes of the Charente-Maritime department
