= Fontenet =

- Commune
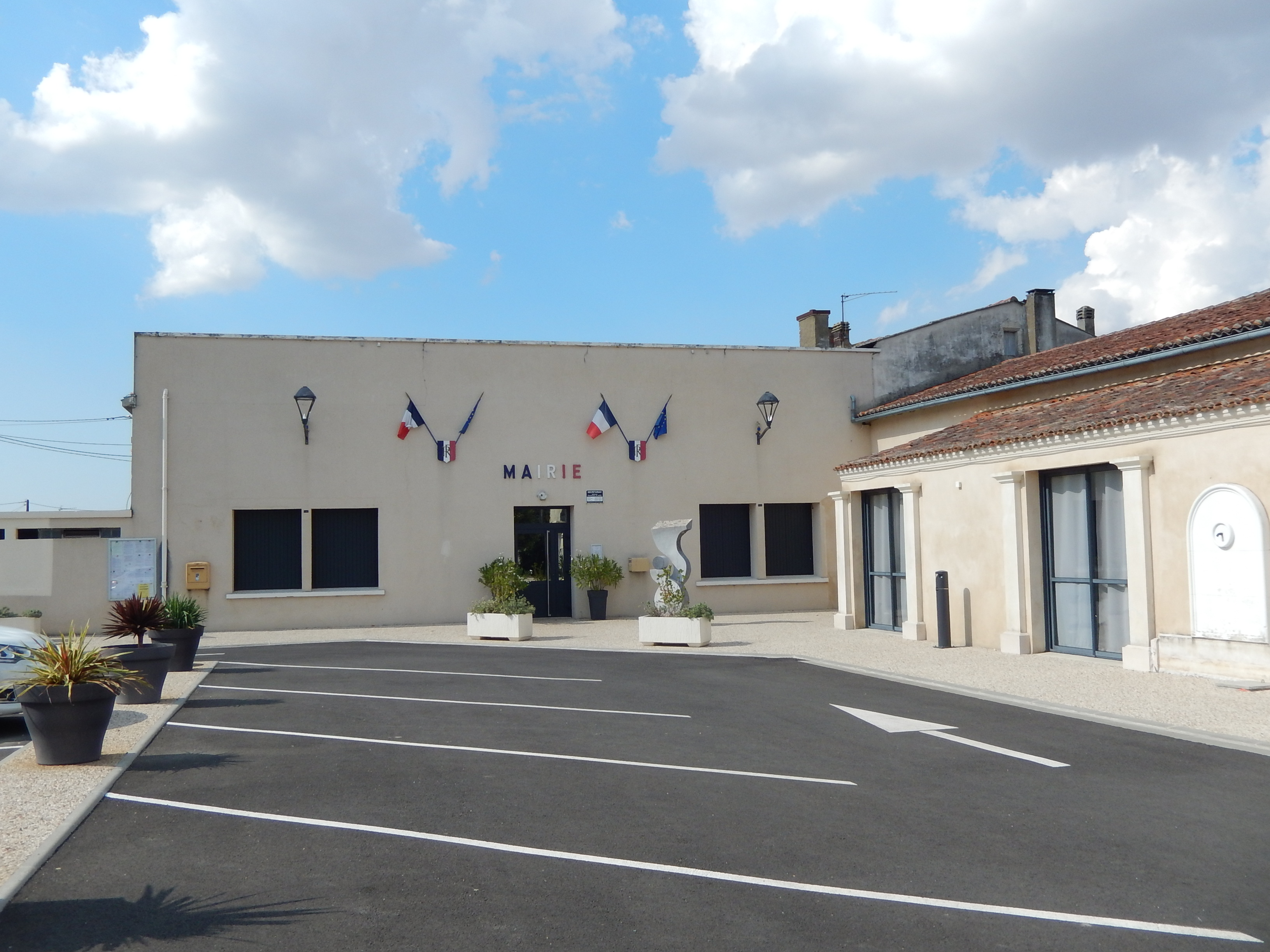
- The town hall in Fontenet
- Location of Fontenet
- Location within France Location within Nouvelle-Aquitaine
- Coordinates: 45°54′48″N 0°27′08″W
- Country: France
- Region: Nouvelle-Aquitaine
- Department: Charente-Maritime
- Arrondissement: Saint-Jean-d'Angély
- Canton: Matha
- Intercommunality: Vals de Saintonge

Government
  - Mayor (2020–2026): Pascal Sagy
- Area^{1}: 10.27 km^{2} (3.97 sq mi)
- Elevation: 25 m (82 ft)
- Highest elevation: 76 m (249 ft)
- Lowest elevation: 19 m (62 ft)
- Population (2023): 391
  - Density: 38.1/km^{2} (98.6/sq mi)
- Time zone: UTC+01:00 (CET)
  - Summer (DST): UTC+02:00 (CEST)
- INSEE/Postal code: 17165 /17400
- ^{1} French Land Register data, which excludes lakes, ponds, glaciers > 1 km^{2} (0.386 sq mi or 247 acres) and river estuaries.

Fontenet (French pronunciation: [fɔ̃tnɛ]) is a commune in the Charente-Maritime department in southwestern France.

== Population ==
Historical population
Year	Pop.	±% p.a.
1968	454	—
1975	394	−2.00%
1982	393	−0.04%
1990	365	−0.92%
1999	371	+0.18%
2007	369	−0.07%
2012	394	+1.32%
2017	396	+0.10%
2023	391	−0.21%
Source: INSEE

== See also ==
- Communes of the Charente-Maritime department
