= Neuvicq-le-Château =

- Commune
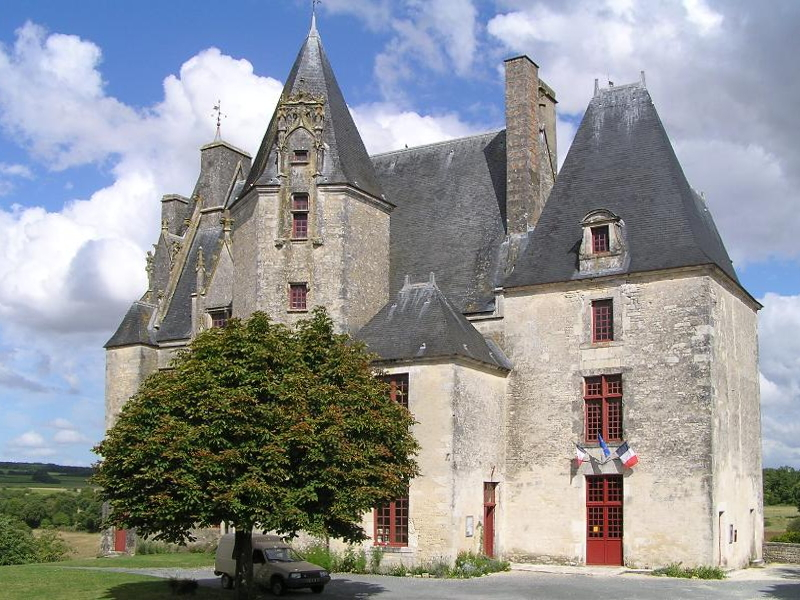
- The chateau in Neuvicq-le-Château
- Location of Neuvicq-le-Château
- Location within France Location within Nouvelle-Aquitaine
- Coordinates: 45°48′13″N 0°09′48″W
- Country: France
- Region: Nouvelle-Aquitaine
- Department: Charente-Maritime
- Arrondissement: Saint-Jean-d'Angély
- Canton: Matha

Government
  - Mayor (2020–2026): Pierre Denechere
- Area^{1}: 15.14 km^{2} (5.85 sq mi)
- Elevation: 100 m (330 ft)
- Highest elevation: 156 m (512 ft)
- Lowest elevation: 47 m (154 ft)
- Population (2023): 365
  - Density: 24.1/km^{2} (62.4/sq mi)
- Time zone: UTC+01:00 (CET)
  - Summer (DST): UTC+02:00 (CEST)
- INSEE/Postal code: 17261 /17490
- ^{1} French Land Register data, which excludes lakes, ponds, glaciers > 1 km^{2} (0.386 sq mi or 247 acres) and river estuaries.

Neuvicq-le-Château (French pronunciation: [nøvik lə ʃɑto]) is a commune in the Charente-Maritime department in southwestern France.

== Population ==
Historical population
Year	Pop.	±% p.a.
1968	504	—
1975	433	−2.15%
1982	406	−0.92%
1990	385	−0.66%
1999	381	−0.12%
2007	393	+0.39%
2012	355	−2.01%
2017	321	−1.99%
2023	365	+2.16%
Source: INSEE

== See also ==
- Communes of the Charente-Maritime department
