= Haimps =

- Commune
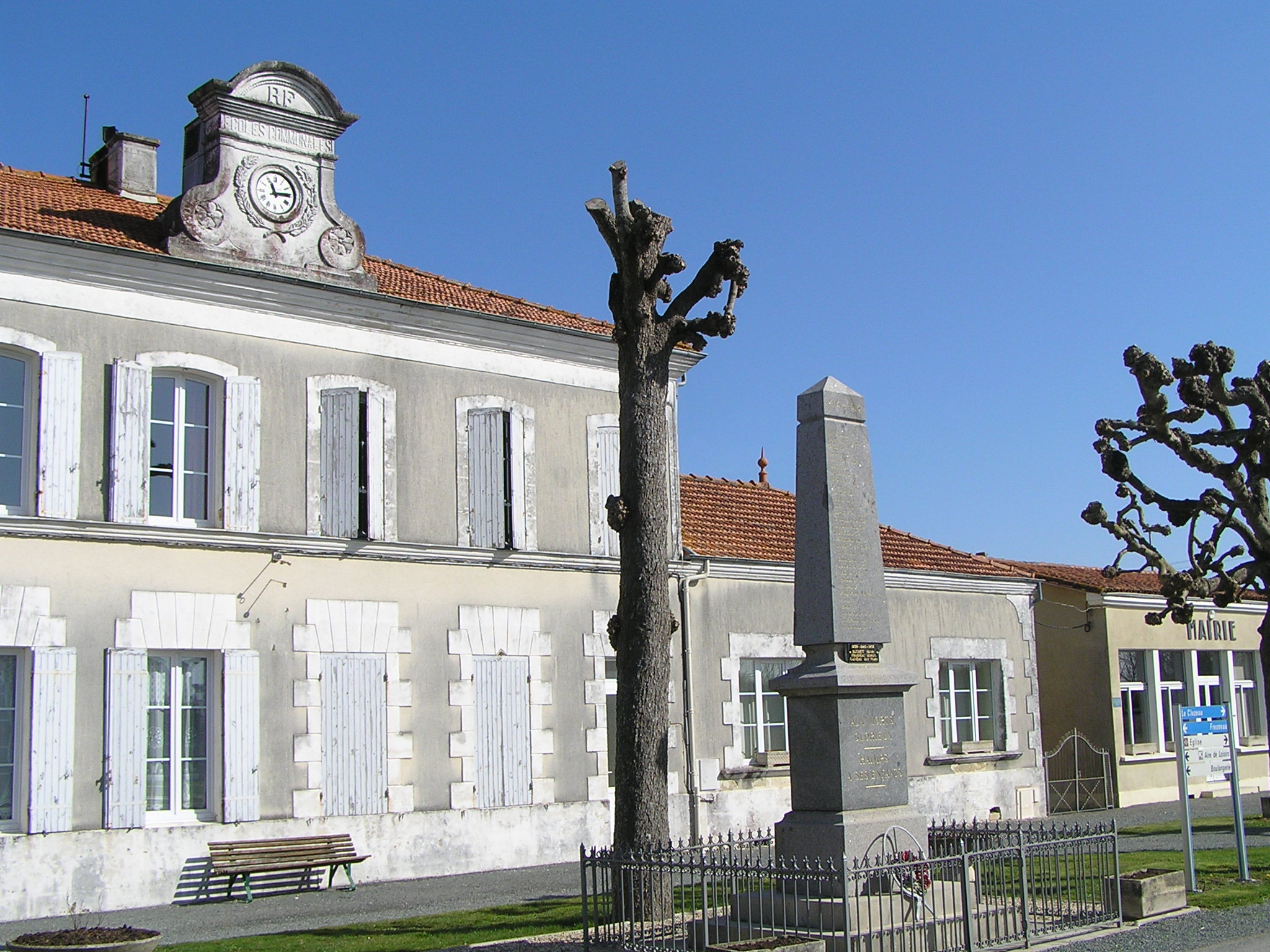
- Town hall
- Location of Haimps
- Location within France Location within Nouvelle-Aquitaine
- Coordinates: 45°52′06″N 0°15′30″W
- Country: France
- Region: Nouvelle-Aquitaine
- Department: Charente-Maritime
- Arrondissement: Saint-Jean-d'Angély
- Canton: Matha

Government
  - Mayor (2020–2026): Thierry Goujeaud
- Area^{1}: 18.47 km^{2} (7.13 sq mi)
- Elevation: 55 m (180 ft)
- Highest elevation: 100 m (330 ft)
- Lowest elevation: 41 m (135 ft)
- Population (2023): 448
  - Density: 24.3/km^{2} (62.8/sq mi)
- Time zone: UTC+01:00 (CET)
  - Summer (DST): UTC+02:00 (CEST)
- INSEE/Postal code: 17188 /17160
- ^{1} French Land Register data, which excludes lakes, ponds, glaciers > 1 km^{2} (0.386 sq mi or 247 acres) and river estuaries.

Haimps is a commune in the Charente-Maritime department in southwestern France.

== Population ==
Historical population
Year	Pop.	±% p.a.
1968	550	—
1975	495	−1.49%
1982	510	+0.43%
1990	466	−1.12%
1999	427	−0.97%
2007	514	+2.35%
2012	470	−1.77%
2017	464	−0.26%
2023	448	−0.58%
Source: INSEE

== See also ==
- Communes of the Charente-Maritime department
