= Saleignes =

- Commune
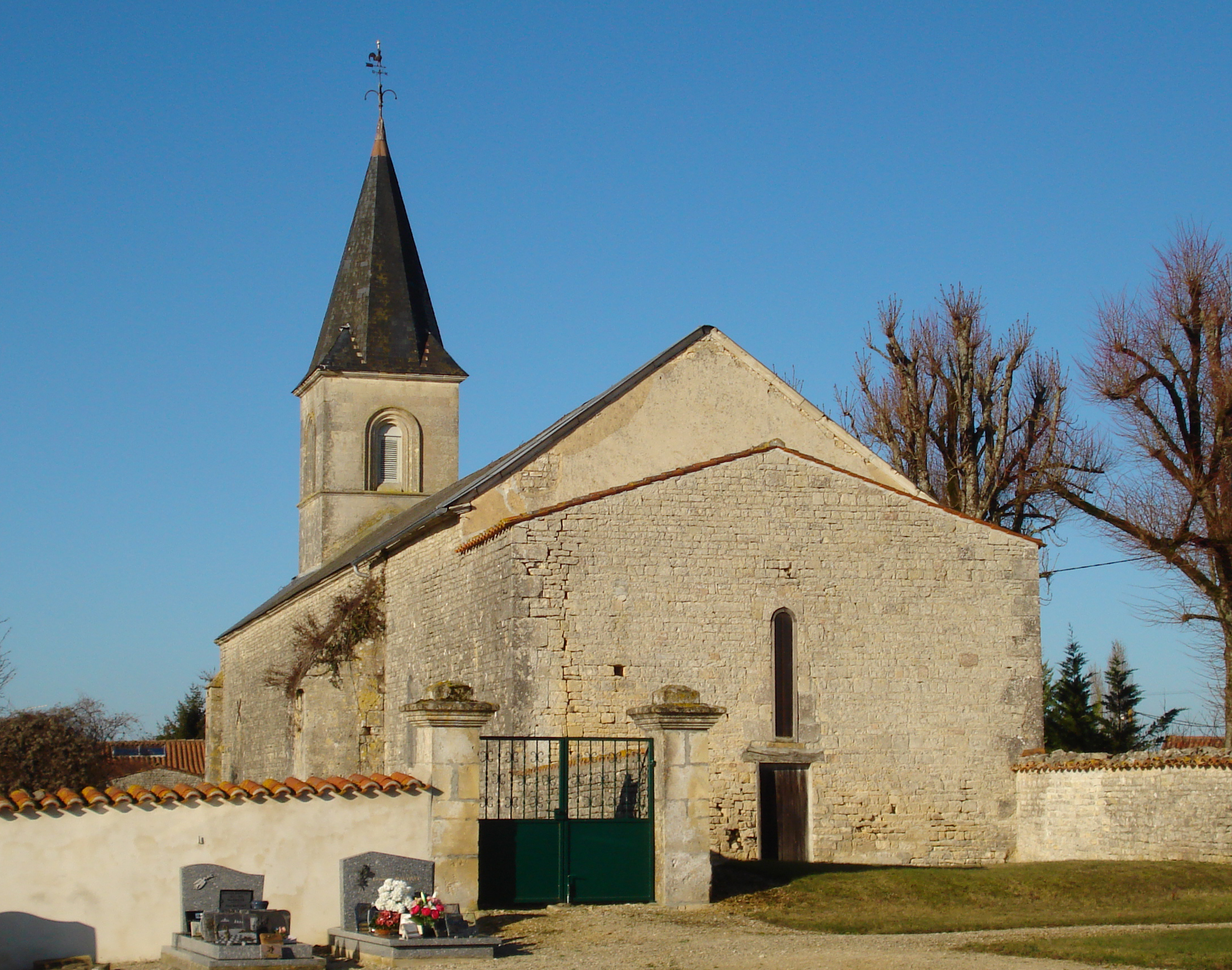
- The church in Saleignes
- Location of Saleignes
- Location within France Location within Nouvelle-Aquitaine
- Coordinates: 46°00′37″N 0°11′12″W
- Country: France
- Region: Nouvelle-Aquitaine
- Department: Charente-Maritime
- Arrondissement: Saint-Jean-d'Angély
- Canton: Matha

Government
  - Mayor (2020–2026): Christelle Marchet
- Area^{1}: 7.89 km^{2} (3.05 sq mi)
- Highest elevation: 149 m (489 ft)
- Lowest elevation: 111 m (364 ft)
- Population (2023): 56
  - Density: 7.1/km^{2} (18/sq mi)
- Time zone: UTC+01:00 (CET)
  - Summer (DST): UTC+02:00 (CEST)
- INSEE/Postal code: 17416 /17510
- ^{1} French Land Register data, which excludes lakes, ponds, glaciers > 1 km^{2} (0.386 sq mi or 247 acres) and river estuaries.

Saleignes (French pronunciation: [salɛɲ]) is a commune in the Charente-Maritime department in southwestern France.

== Population ==
Historical population
Year	Pop.	±% p.a.
1968	138	—
1975	134	−0.42%
1982	117	−1.92%
1990	97	−2.32%
1999	77	−2.53%
2007	67	−1.72%
2012	62	−1.54%
2017	62	+0.00%
2023	56	−1.68%
Source: INSEE

== See also ==
- Communes of the Charente-Maritime department
