= Canton of Matha =

Coordinates: 45.87°N 0.32°W

The canton of Matha is an administrative division of the Charente-Maritime department, western France. Its borders were modified at the French canton reorganisation which came into effect in March 2015. Its seat is in Matha.

It consists of the following communes:

1. Antezant-la-Chapelle
2. Asnières-la-Giraud
3. Aulnay
4. Bagnizeau
5. Ballans
6. Bazauges
7. Beauvais-sur-Matha
8. Blanzac-lès-Matha
9. Blanzay-sur-Boutonne
10. Bresdon
11. Brie-sous-Matha
12. La Brousse
13. Cherbonnières
14. Chives
15. Coivert
16. Contré
17. Courcelles
18. Courcerac
19. Cressé
20. Dampierre-sur-Boutonne
21. Les Éduts
22. Les Églises-d'Argenteuil
23. Fontaine-Chalendray
24. Fontenet
25. Gibourne
26. Le Gicq
27. Gourvillette
28. Haimps
29. Loiré-sur-Nie
30. Louzignac
31. Macqueville
32. Massac
33. Matha
34. Mons
35. Néré
36. Neuvicq-le-Château
37. Paillé
38. Poursay-Garnaud
39. Prignac
40. Rives-de-Boutonne
41. Romazières
42. Saint-Julien-de-l'Escap
43. Saint-Mandé-sur-Brédoire
44. Saint-Martial
45. Saint-Martin-de-Juillers
46. Saint-Ouen-la-Thène
47. Saint-Pardoult
48. Saint-Pierre-de-Juillers
49. Saint-Pierre-de-l'Isle
50. Saint-Séverin-sur-Boutonne
51. Saleignes
52. Seigné
53. Siecq
54. Sonnac
55. Thors
56. Les Touches-de-Périgny
57. Varaize
58. Vervant
59. La Villedieu
60. Villemorin
61. Villiers-Couture
62. Vinax
