= Bagnizeau =

- Commune
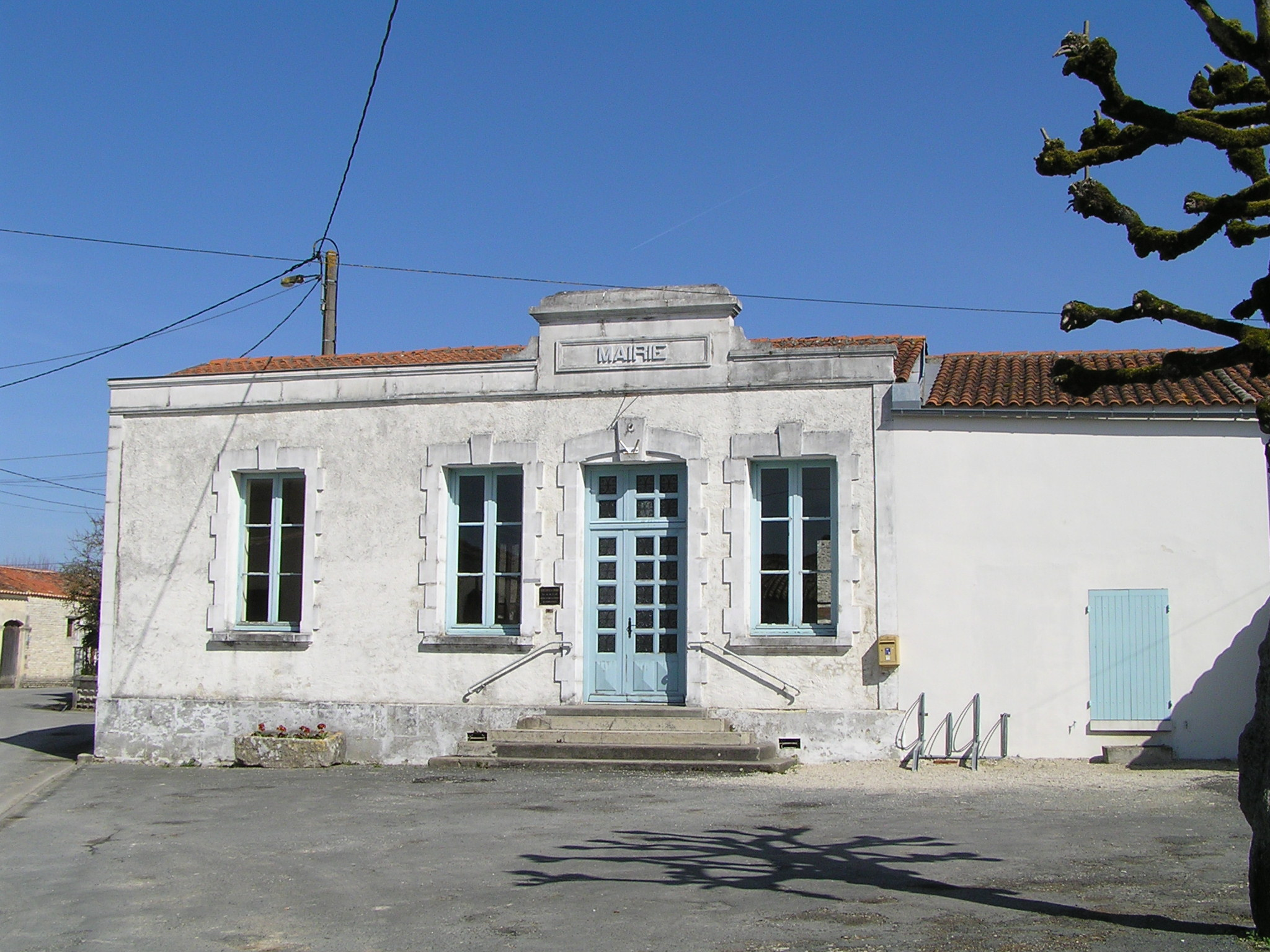
- The town hall in Bagnizeau
- Location of Bagnizeau
- Location within France Location within Nouvelle-Aquitaine
- Coordinates: 45°53′21″N 0°18′43″W
- Country: France
- Region: Nouvelle-Aquitaine
- Department: Charente-Maritime
- Arrondissement: Saint-Jean-d'Angély
- Canton: Matha

Government
  - Mayor (2020–2026): Gilles Venner
- Area^{1}: 9.63 km^{2} (3.72 sq mi)
- Elevation: 49 m (161 ft)
- Highest elevation: 88 m (289 ft)
- Lowest elevation: 40 m (130 ft)
- Population (2023): 177
  - Density: 18.4/km^{2} (47.6/sq mi)
- Time zone: UTC+01:00 (CET)
  - Summer (DST): UTC+02:00 (CEST)
- INSEE/Postal code: 17029 /17160
- ^{1} French Land Register data, which excludes lakes, ponds, glaciers > 1 km^{2} (0.386 sq mi or 247 acres) and river estuaries.

Bagnizeau (French pronunciation: [baɲizo]) is a commune in the Charente-Maritime department in southwestern France.

== Population ==
Historical population
Year	Pop.	±% p.a.
1968	186	—
1975	173	−1.03%
1982	166	−0.59%
1990	160	−0.46%
1999	187	+1.75%
2007	187	+0.00%
2012	189	+0.21%
2017	207	+1.84%
2023	177	−2.58%
Source: INSEE

== See also ==
- Communes of the Charente-Maritime department
