= Mons, Charente-Maritime =

Mons
- Commune
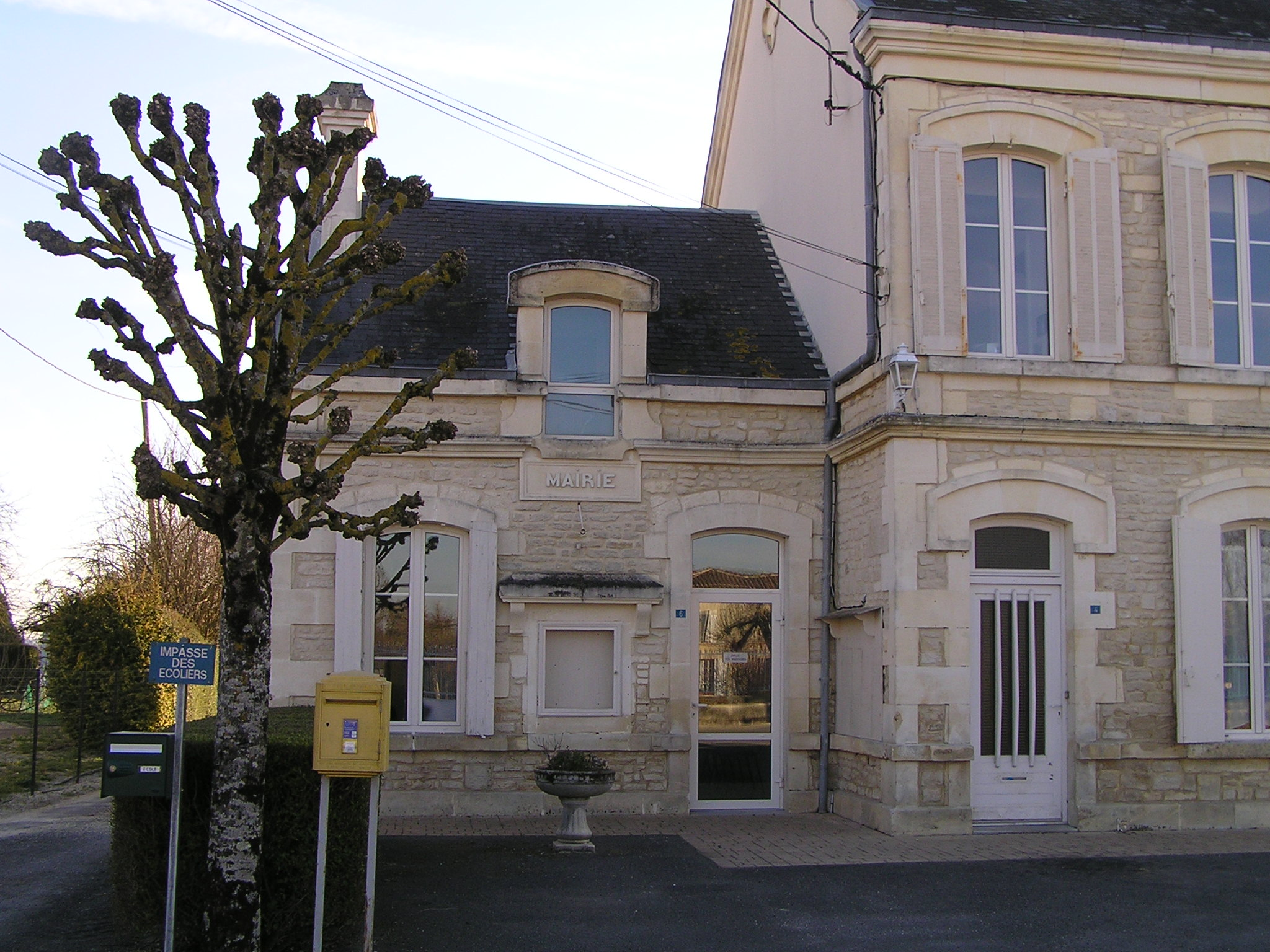
- Town hall
- Location of Mons
- Location within France Location within Nouvelle-Aquitaine
- Coordinates: 45°49′18″N 0°20′39″W
- Country: France
- Region: Nouvelle-Aquitaine
- Department: Charente-Maritime
- Arrondissement: Saint-Jean-d'Angély
- Canton: Matha

Government
  - Mayor (2020–2026): Jean-Michel Manceau
- Area^{1}: 15.63 km^{2} (6.03 sq mi)
- Elevation: 24 m (79 ft)
- Highest elevation: 31 m (102 ft)
- Lowest elevation: 14 m (46 ft)
- Population (2023): 445
  - Density: 28.5/km^{2} (73.7/sq mi)
- Time zone: UTC+01:00 (CET)
  - Summer (DST): UTC+02:00 (CEST)
- INSEE/Postal code: 17239 /17160
- ^{1} French Land Register data, which excludes lakes, ponds, glaciers > 1 km^{2} (0.386 sq mi or 247 acres) and river estuaries.

Mons (French pronunciation: [mɔ̃s]) is a commune in the Charente-Maritime department in southwestern France.

== Population ==
Historical population
Year	Pop.	±% p.a.
1968	530	—
1975	509	−0.58%
1982	488	−0.60%
1990	439	−1.31%
1999	448	+0.23%
2007	457	+0.25%
2012	443	−0.62%
2017	438	−0.23%
2023	445	+0.26%
Source: INSEE

== See also ==
- Communes of the Charente-Maritime department
