= Thors, Charente-Maritime =

Thors
- Commune
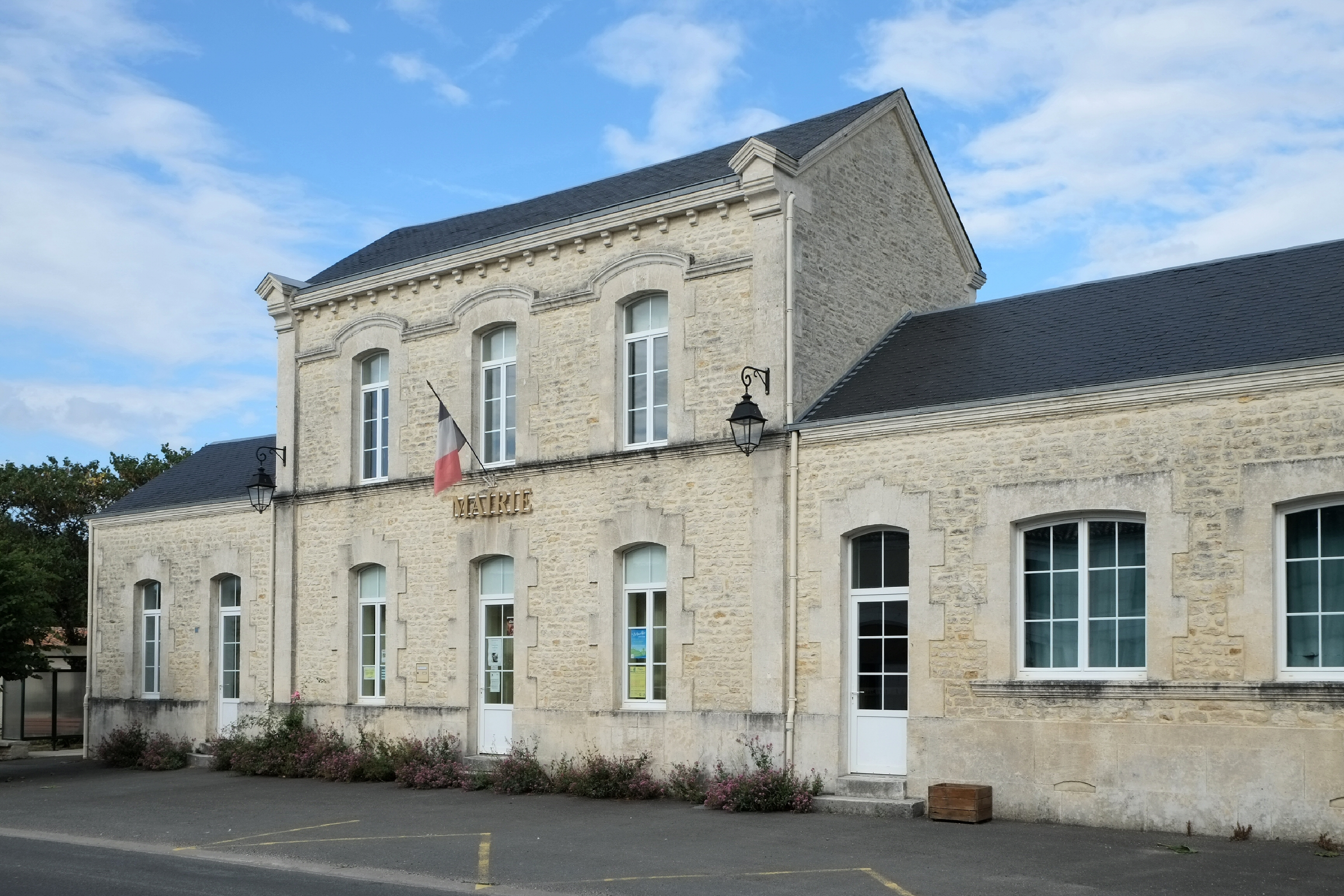
- The town hall in Thors
- Location of Thors
- Location within France Location within Nouvelle-Aquitaine
- Coordinates: 45°49′58″N 0°18′40″W
- Country: France
- Region: Nouvelle-Aquitaine
- Department: Charente-Maritime
- Arrondissement: Saint-Jean-d'Angély
- Canton: Matha

Government
  - Mayor (2020–2026): Fabrice Renaud
- Area^{1}: 5.55 km^{2} (2.14 sq mi)
- Elevation: 23 m (75 ft)
- Highest elevation: 36 m (118 ft)
- Lowest elevation: 18 m (59 ft)
- Population (2023): 477
  - Density: 85.9/km^{2} (223/sq mi)
- Time zone: UTC+01:00 (CET)
  - Summer (DST): UTC+02:00 (CEST)
- INSEE/Postal code: 17446 /17160
- ^{1} French Land Register data, which excludes lakes, ponds, glaciers > 1 km^{2} (0.386 sq mi or 247 acres) and river estuaries.

Thors is a commune in the Charente-Maritime department in southwestern France.

== Population ==
Historical population
Year	Pop.	±% p.a.
1968	460	—
1975	441	−0.60%
1982	454	+0.42%
1990	456	+0.05%
1999	411	−1.15%
2007	404	−0.21%
2012	441	+1.77%
2017	460	+0.85%
2023	477	+0.61%
Source: INSEE

== See also ==
- Communes of the Charente-Maritime department
