= Saint-Martin-de-Juillers =

- Commune
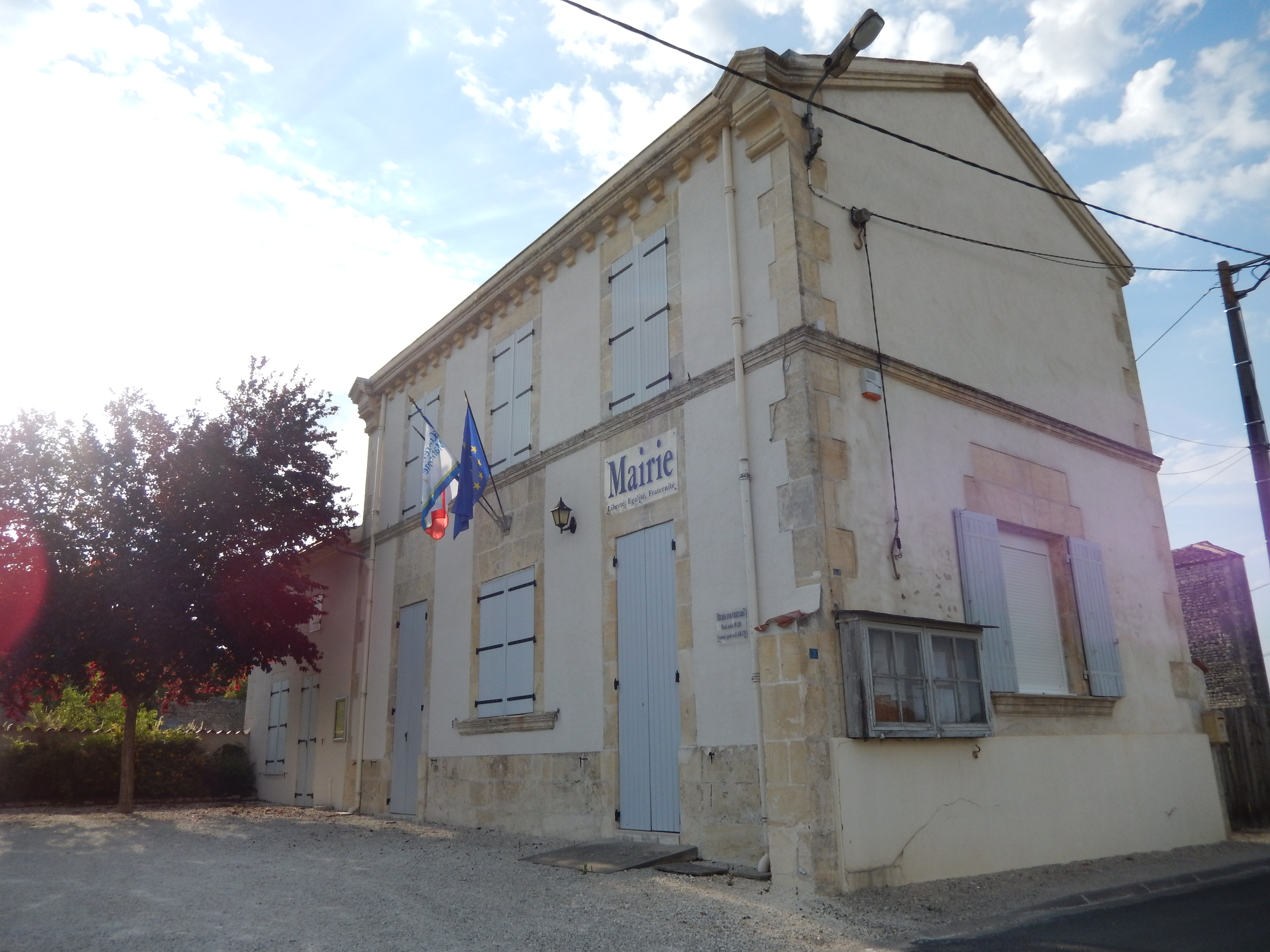
- The town hall in Saint-Martin-de-Juillers
- Location of Saint-Martin-de-Juillers
- Location within France Location within Nouvelle-Aquitaine
- Coordinates: 45°56′37″N 0°21′33″W
- Country: France
- Region: Nouvelle-Aquitaine
- Department: Charente-Maritime
- Arrondissement: Saint-Jean-d'Angély
- Canton: Matha

Government
  - Mayor (2020–2026): Sylvie Pouillet
- Area^{1}: 8.38 km^{2} (3.24 sq mi)
- Elevation: 53 m (174 ft)
- Highest elevation: 88 m (289 ft)
- Lowest elevation: 44 m (144 ft)
- Population (2023): 151
  - Density: 18.0/km^{2} (46.7/sq mi)
- Time zone: UTC+01:00 (CET)
  - Summer (DST): UTC+02:00 (CEST)
- INSEE/Postal code: 17367 /17400
- ^{1} French Land Register data, which excludes lakes, ponds, glaciers > 1 km^{2} (0.386 sq mi or 247 acres) and river estuaries.

Saint-Martin-de-Juillers (French pronunciation: [sɛ̃ maʁtɛ̃ də ʒɥije]) is a commune in the Charente-Maritime department in southwestern France.

== Population ==
Historical population
Year	Pop.	±% p.a.
1968	219	—
1975	182	−2.61%
1982	168	−1.14%
1990	164	−0.30%
1999	148	−1.13%
2007	161	+1.06%
2012	173	+1.45%
2017	158	−1.80%
2023	151	−0.75%
Source: INSEE

== See also ==
- Communes of the Charente-Maritime department
