= Chives, Charente-Maritime =

Chives
- Commune
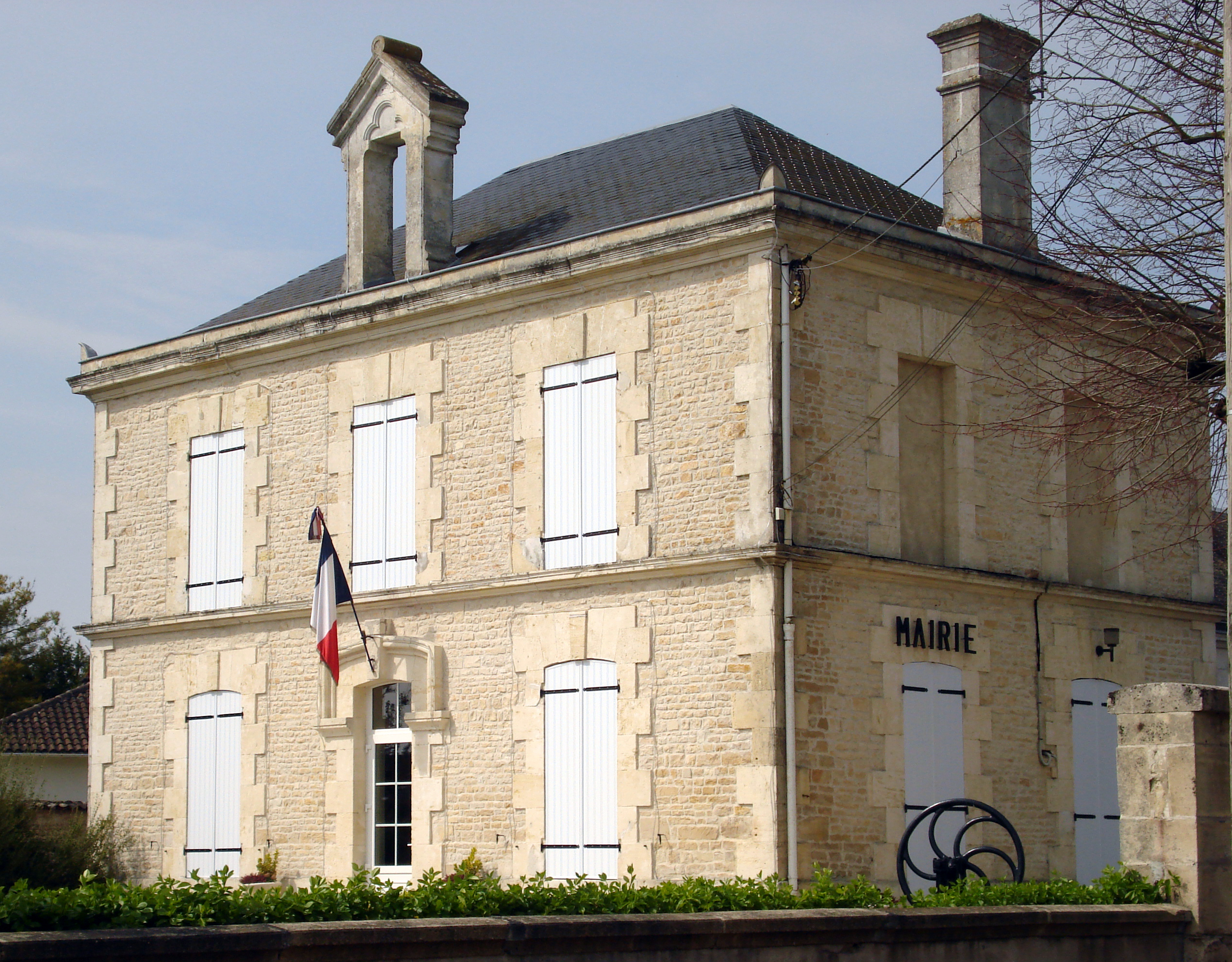
- The town hall in Chives
- Location of Chives
- Location within France Location within Nouvelle-Aquitaine
- Coordinates: 45°57′32″N 0°07′33″W
- Country: France
- Region: Nouvelle-Aquitaine
- Department: Charente-Maritime
- Arrondissement: Saint-Jean-d'Angély
- Canton: Matha

Government
  - Mayor (2020–2026): Stéphanie Grimaud
- Area^{1}: 20.66 km^{2} (7.98 sq mi)
- Highest elevation: 142 m (466 ft)
- Lowest elevation: 82 m (269 ft)
- Population (2023): 317
  - Density: 15.3/km^{2} (39.7/sq mi)
- Time zone: UTC+01:00 (CET)
  - Summer (DST): UTC+02:00 (CEST)
- INSEE/Postal code: 17105 /17510
- ^{1} French Land Register data, which excludes lakes, ponds, glaciers > 1 km^{2} (0.386 sq mi or 247 acres) and river estuaries.

Chives (French pronunciation: [ʃiv]) is a commune in the Charente-Maritime department in southwestern France.

== Population ==
Historical population
Year	Pop.	±% p.a.
1968	502	—
1975	444	−1.74%
1982	457	+0.41%
1990	424	−0.93%
1999	378	−1.27%
2007	371	−0.23%
2012	360	−0.60%
2017	331	−1.67%
2023	317	−0.72%
Source: INSEE

== See also ==
- Communes of the Charente-Maritime department
