= Paillé =

- Commune
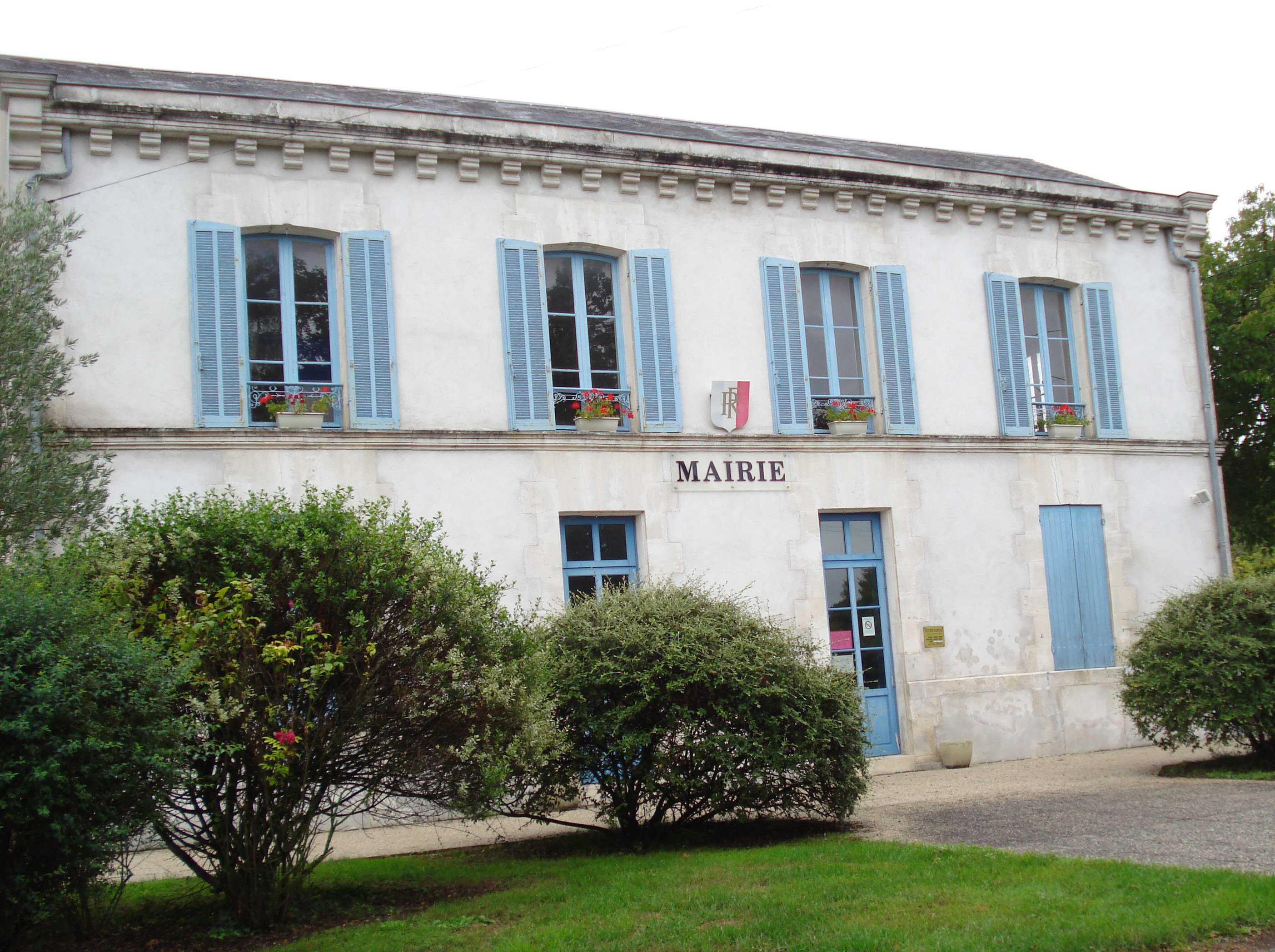
- The town hall in Paillé
- Location of Paillé
- Location within France Location within Nouvelle-Aquitaine
- Coordinates: 45°59′25″N 0°23′32″W
- Country: France
- Region: Nouvelle-Aquitaine
- Department: Charente-Maritime
- Arrondissement: Saint-Jean-d'Angély
- Canton: Matha
- Intercommunality: Vals de Saintonge

Government
  - Mayor (2020–2026): Ornella Tache
- Area^{1}: 12.44 km^{2} (4.80 sq mi)
- Highest elevation: 89 m (292 ft)
- Lowest elevation: 28 m (92 ft)
- Population (2023): 326
  - Density: 26.2/km^{2} (67.9/sq mi)
- Time zone: UTC+01:00 (CET)
  - Summer (DST): UTC+02:00 (CEST)
- INSEE/Postal code: 17271 /17470
- ^{1} French Land Register data, which excludes lakes, ponds, glaciers > 1 km^{2} (0.386 sq mi or 247 acres) and river estuaries.

Paillé (French pronunciation: [paje]) is a commune in the Charente-Maritime department in southwestern France.

== Population ==
Historical population
Year	Pop.	±% p.a.
1968	442	—
1975	407	−1.17%
1982	375	−1.16%
1990	333	−1.47%
1999	366	+1.06%
2007	333	−1.17%
2012	347	+0.83%
2017	315	−1.92%
2023	326	+0.57%
Source: INSEE

== See also ==
- Communes of the Charente-Maritime department
