= Antenne Valley =

Special area of conservation in France

- Vallée de l'Antenne
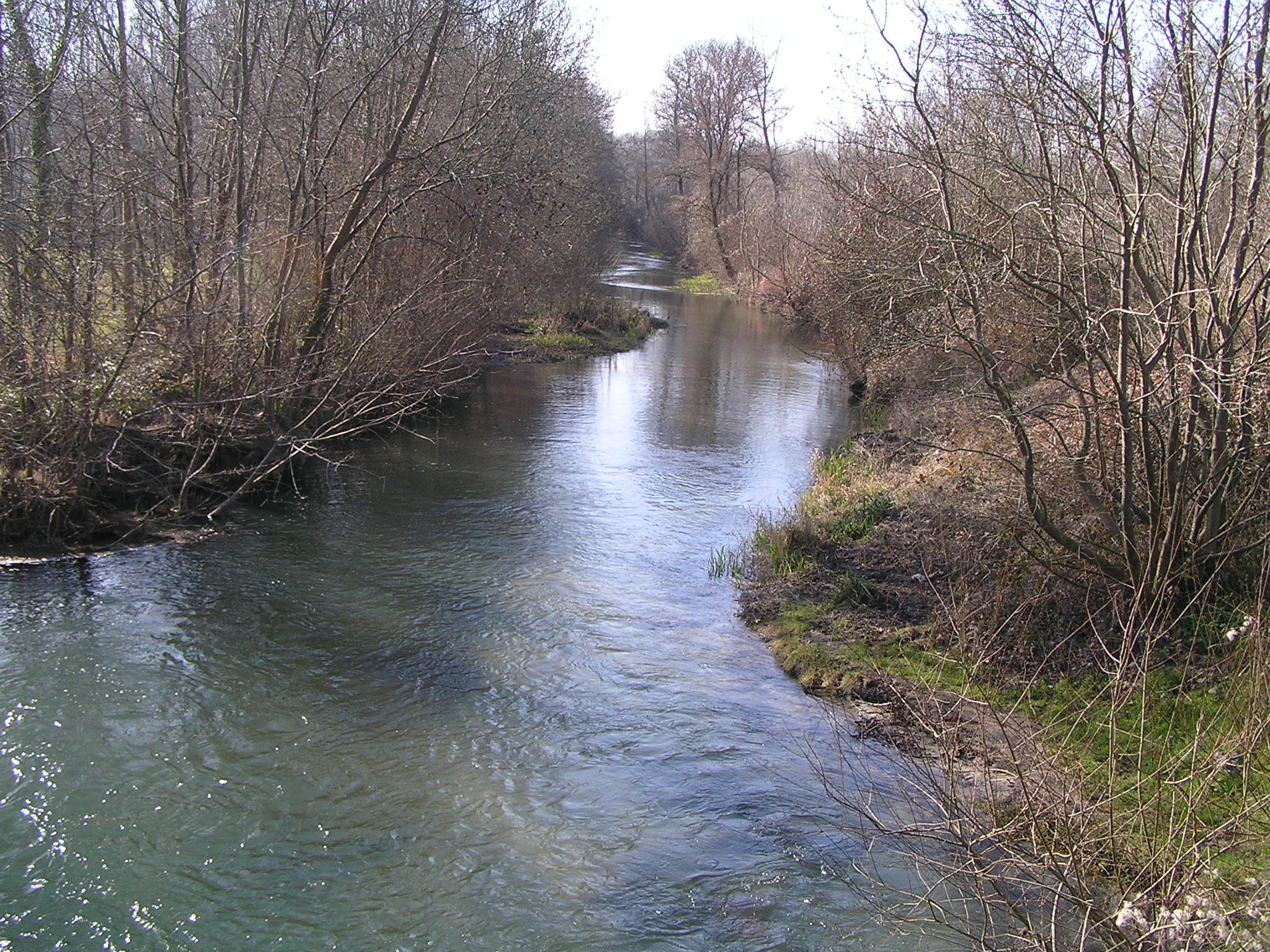
- The Antenne in Mesnac

- Location within France
- Area: 1 208 ha

Geology
- Type: Special Area of Conservation

Geography
- Location: http://valleedelantenne.n2000.fr/
- Country: France
- Departments: Charente-Maritime and Charente
- Region: Nouvelle-Aquitaine
- Nearest commune: Cognac
- Coordinates: 45°46′49″N 0°21′57″W
- Interactive map of Antenne Valley

The Antenne Valley is a Natura 2000 special area of conservation located in the Charente-Maritime and Charente regions, in the valley of the Antenne, a tributary on the right bank of the Charente. It covers the entire river and most of its affluents, including the Briou.

It was submitted in March 1999 for 1,173 ha and validated on February 12, 2004, for 1,208 ha.

The valley has been designated a Natura 2000 site, as it is home to seven natural habitats of Community interest, as well as nineteen species of Community interest, some of which have been given priority status: the European mink, bats (chiropterans), and an insect, the rosalia longicorn.

== Location ==
The Antenne Valley site was proposed for Natura 2000 designation at 1,173 ha, of which 541 ha were in Charente-Maritime and 632 ha in Charente, then increased to 1,208 ha, with 548 ha in Charente-Maritime and 660 ha in Charente. It comprises the entire length of the Antenne from its source at Fontaine-Chalendray and the major streambed from Prignac to Cognac.

The territory of the Antenne Valley is covered by several protected areas: the Natura 2000 site that bears the valley's name borders on two Special Protection Areas (SPAs): that of the Charente moyenne et Seugne's valley (named SPA 05 in the table below) and that of the Néré à Bresdon plain (named SPA 24).

This Natura 2000 area also includes a natural zone of ecological, faunistic, and floristic interest (ZNIEFF) of the same name. It is a first-generation ZNIEFF (type I) covering 709.7 hectares spread over five communes. Several of the ZNIEFFs listed below are located nearby, but are not included in the Natura 2000 classification perimeter.

There are important bird conservation areas (ZICO) nearby (notably in the Charente and Seugne valleys), but not in the Antenne Valley itself.

Commune	Department	Area (km^{2})	Classified area	Details
Aujac	Charente-Maritime	8,73	0,440	
Aumagne	Charente-Maritime	20,50	0,000	
Authon-Ébéon	Charente-Maritime	11,65	0,116	
Bagnizeau	Charente-Maritime	9,63	0,090	
Blanzac-lès-Matha	Charente-Maritime	9,42	0,090	
Bresdon	Charente-Maritime	16,67	0,000	ZPS 24
La Brousse	Charente-Maritime	18,84	0,188	
Cherves-Richemont	Charente	37,94	2,660	ZNIEFF n^{o} 467 et ZNIEFF n^{o} 002
Cognac	Charente	15,50	0,010	ZPS 05 et ZNIEFF n^{o} 574
Courcerac	Charente-Maritime	6,20	0,370	
Cressé	Charente-Maritime	10,96	0,329	ZPS 24
Fontaine-Chalendray	Charente-Maritime	18,86	0,033	
Gibourne	Charente-Maritime	11,00	0,000	
Haimps	Charente-Maritime	18,47	0,000	
Javrezac	Charente	3,66	0,220	
Louzac-Saint-André	Charente	10,04	0,300	ZNIEFF n^{o} 002
Massac	Charente-Maritime	9,15	0,090	
Matha	Charente-Maritime	19,08	0,190	
Mesnac	Charente	6,51	0,840	ZNIEFF n^{o} 467
Migron	Charente-Maritime	15,06	1,350	ZNIEFF n^{o} 467
Mons	Charente-Maritime	15,63	0,780	
Prignac	Charente-Maritime	6,77	0,340	
Saint-Ouen-la-Thène	Charente-Maritime	7,01	0,070	
Saint-Sulpice-de-Cognac	Charente	23,82	2,570	ZNIEFF n^{o} 467 et ZNIEFF n^{o} 542
Le Seure	Charente-Maritime	5,68	0,680	ZNIEFF n^{o} 467
Siecq	Charente-Maritime	11,66	0,000	
Sonnac	Charente-Maritime	17,12	0,020	
Thors	Charente-Maritime	5,55	0,100	ZNIEFF n^{o} 711.
Les Touches-de-Périgny	Charente-Maritime	21,56	0,210	ZPS 24
Total of 29 communes		392,67	12,080 (3,1 %)	

== Geography and hydrography ==
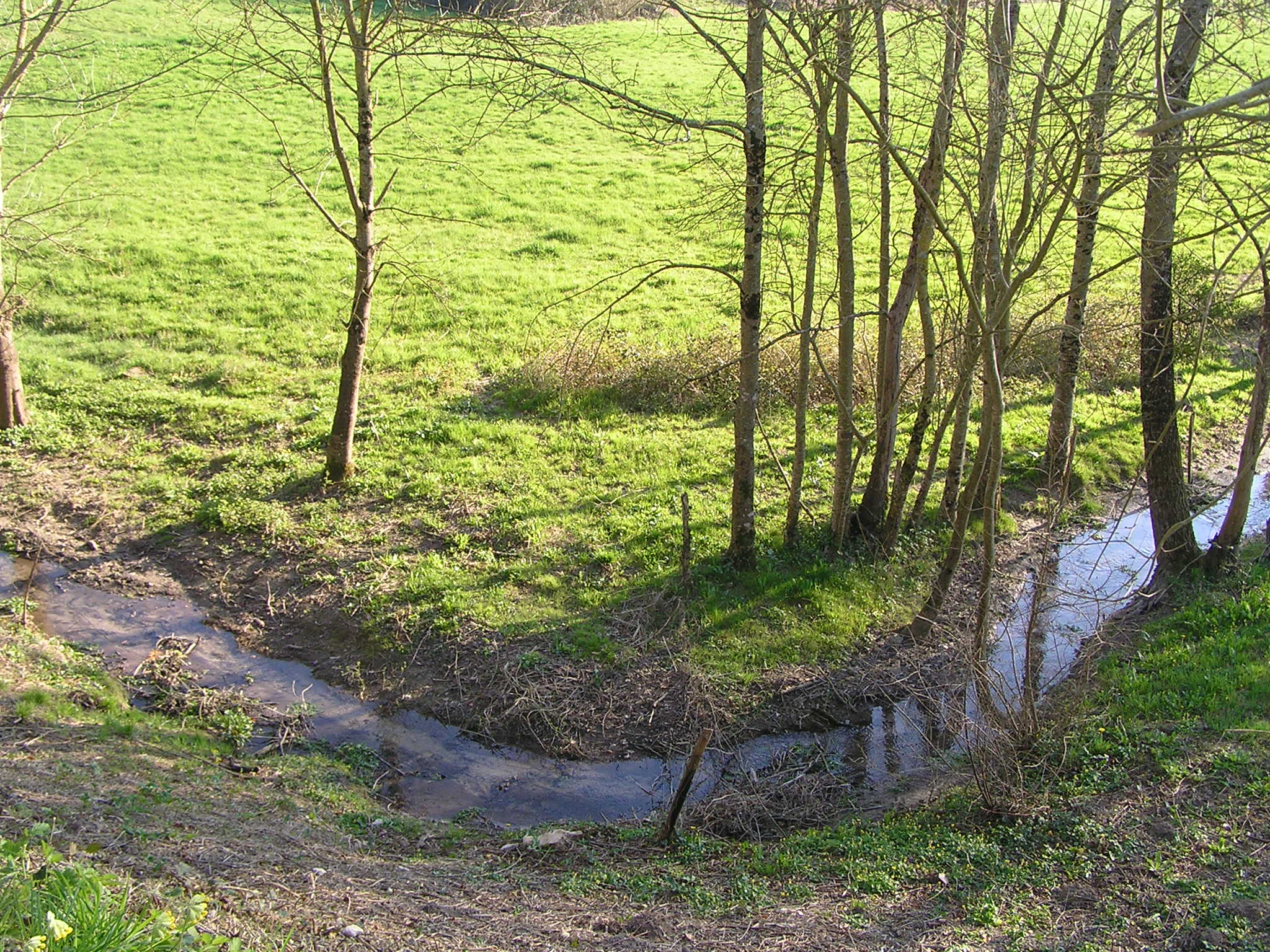
The Antenne near its source at Fontaine-Chalendray.

The 1,208-hectare site is situated at an altitude that reaches a peak of 50 meters, descending slowly along the course of the river to reach 10 meters at its confluence with the Charente. The difference in altitude is therefore 40 meters, although very slight in the second part of the river, which explains the meanders, multiple arms, and marshes.

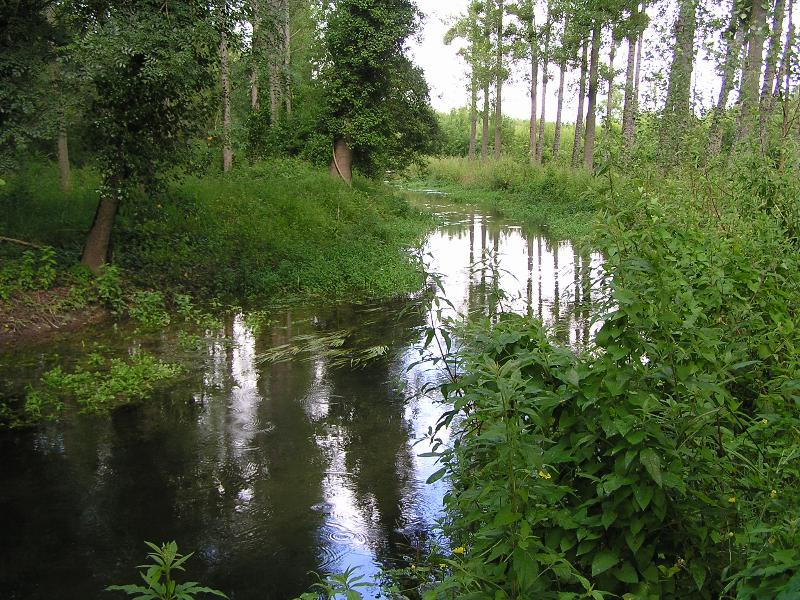
The Antenne at the Chazotte mill, towards Mesnac.

The site covers up to 10% of both running and stagnant waters from the river. The Antenne is a small river, 48.3 km long, with an oceanic river regime and good water quality. North of Prignac, only the minor beds of the Antenne and part of its tributaries (the Briou) have been included in the Natura 2000 zone, as the presence of summer droughts is detrimental to its good conservation status.

From Prignac to its confluence with the Charente, the river has numerous secondary branches and a large floodplain, making it one of the best-preserved alluvial sites in the region. On this downstream section, the entire major riverbed is a Natura 2000 zone.

80% of the site that is forested is almost entirely made up of 48% deciduous forest and 32% monoculture forest, almost exclusively populiculture. The alder-wood riparian forest alternates with poplar plantations, reedbeds, and a few flood-meadows.

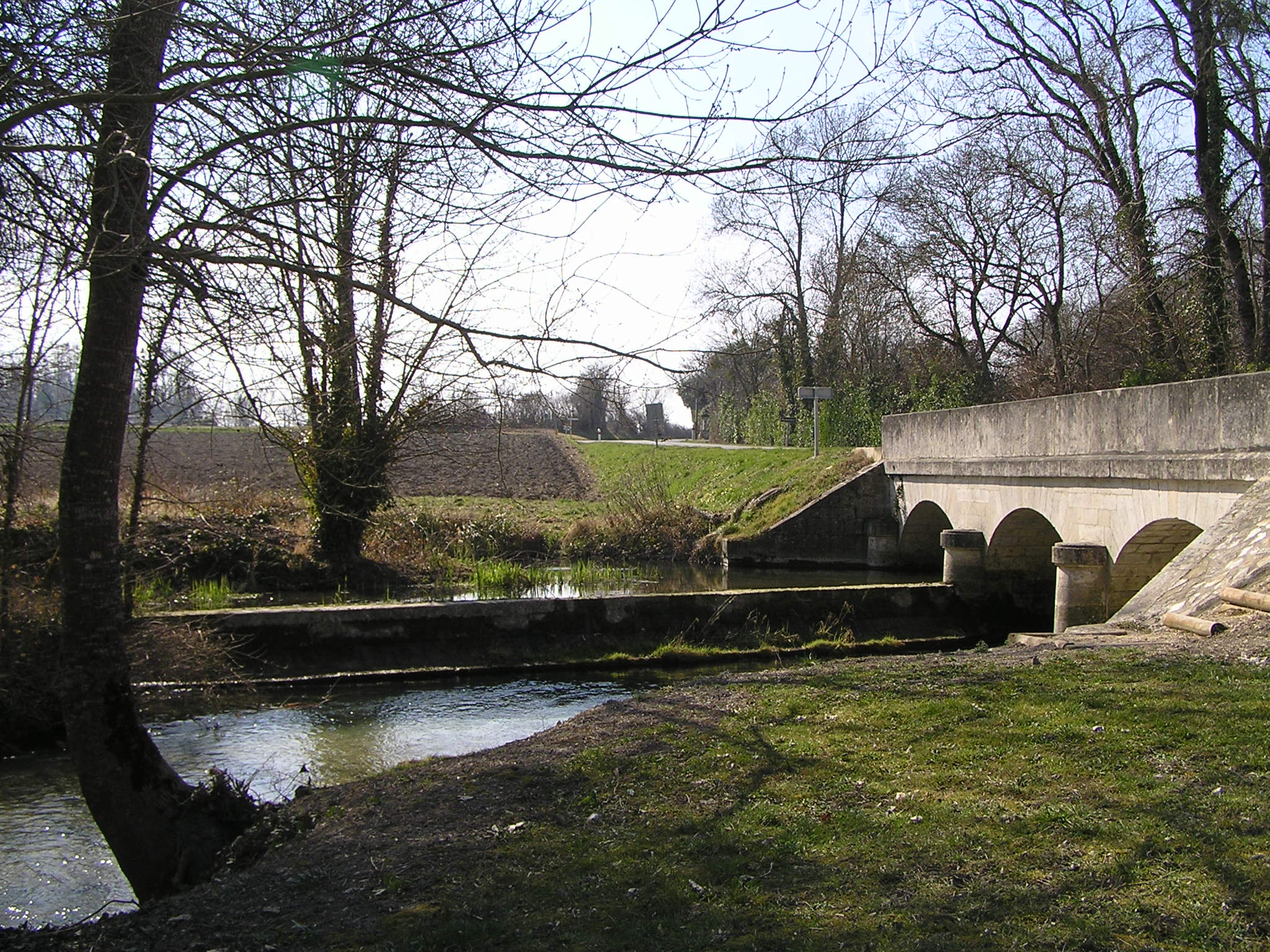
The confluence of the Antenne and Briou rivers at Prignac.

Cereal crops account for 6% of its surface area, with other surfaces (urbanized areas, roads) accounting for 2%.

Of particular interest are two areas of dry grassland and semi-natural wet meadows, each representing 1% of the surface area.

== Achievements ==
The Antenne Valley Natura 2000 site is part of the French national list of sites submitted to the creation of the Natura 2000 network, and was included in it under number FR5400473 in March 1999.

The procedure is managed by the Saint-Jean-d'Angély sub-prefecture, with the Rochefort-based Ligue pour la protection des oiseaux (LPO) as operator.

The management committee, or "Copil", responsible for ensuring that the site is properly managed, is made up of representatives of the local authorities, in particular the mayors of the communes concerned, as well as associations of local residents, foresters, fishermen and nature conservationists, among others.

Natura 2000 contracts are signed directly with the French government or with the European Union, for both agri-environmental measures (MAEt) for agricultural land, and Natura 2000 contracts for non-agricultural land (which are not located on agricultural land).

== Habitats of community interest ==
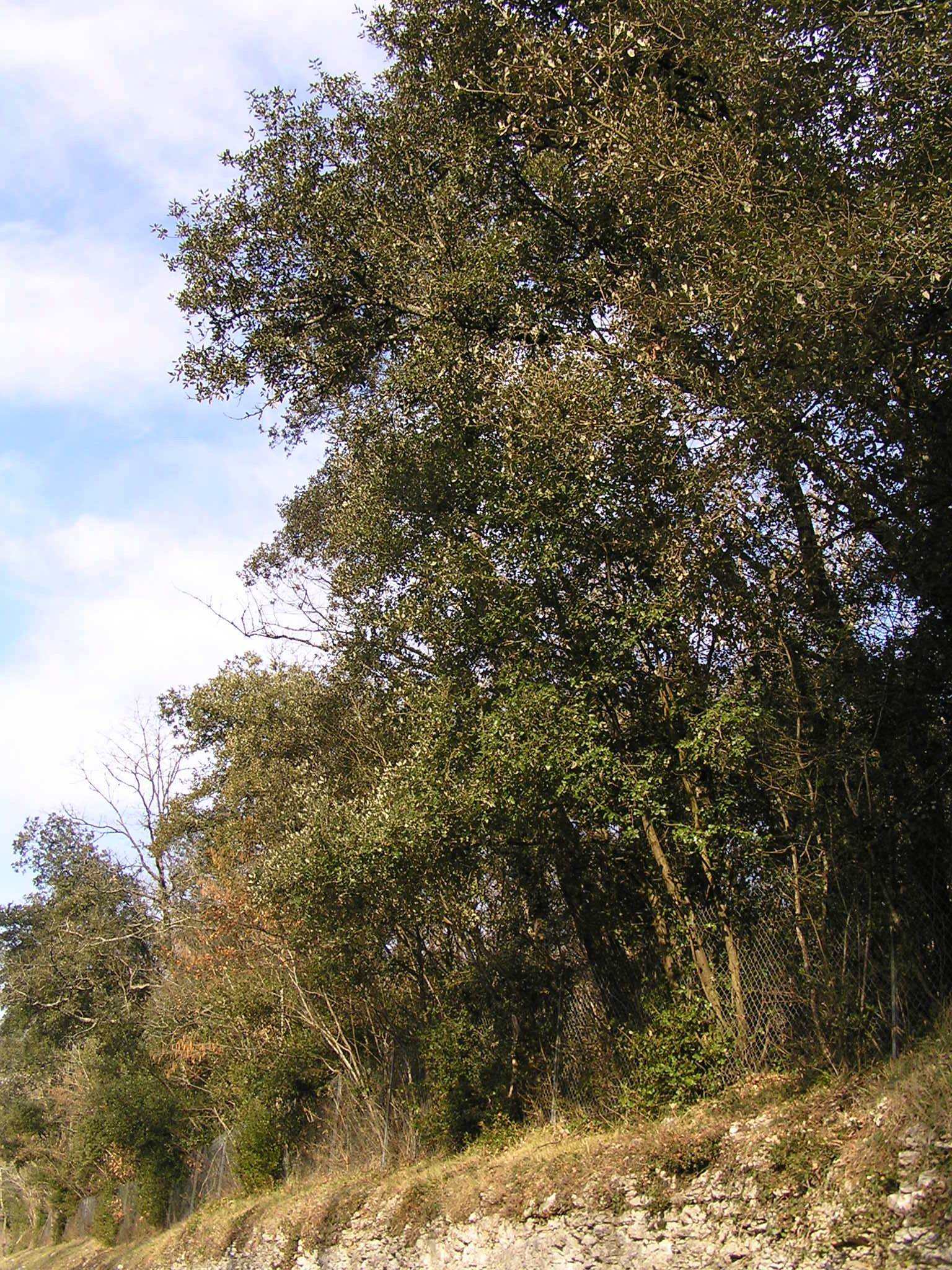
Oak grove at Bricoine (Cherves-Richemont).

The Antenne Valley Natura 2000 site is home to seven natural habitats of "Community Interest" as defined in the Habitats Directive (EU Directive 92/43/EEC, Annex I), all of which are of Importance C (less than 2% of existing areas in France).

The alluvial ash forest or residual alluvial forest with common ash (Fraxinus excelsior) and black alder (Alnus glutinosa) covers 598 ha, or 52% of the site.

A holm oak (Quercus ilex) forest covers 37.01 ha or 3% of the site in Cherves-Richemont, between the river and the D731 at "Bois d'Ouillat".

The river forms two sites:

- First, on half of its surface, i.e. 5% of the site, the water stagnates in the form of natural eutrophic lakes (water rich in algae and plants);
- and then, for 5% of the site, the river itself, in running water, is an habitat of Community interest.

In the commune of Saint-Sulpice-de-Cognac, abandoned underground stone quarries form an underground cavity site for bats. Colonies of chiropterans use them as hibernation and reproduction sites.

Calcicole grasslands, 6.74 ha of which are included in the Natura 2000 zone, are a group of dry grasslands where limestone outcrops. Grasses, other annual plants, and orchids form a specific habitat. Montpellier's milkvetch (Astragalus monspessulanus) is the rarest of the species.

Lowland hay meadows form the seventh natural habitat of Community interest.

== Species of community interest ==
The Antenne Valley Natura 2000 site is home to nineteen species of community interest as defined in the Habitats Directive, Annex II.

=== Mammals ===
The European mink (Mustela lutreola) and otter (Lutra lutra) are permanent occupants of the site's banks. This site is of importance "B" for European mink (presence of 2% to 15% of the known population in France) and "C" for otter (less than 2% of the known population in France).

Bats are present throughout the valley, which serves as their hunting ground: barbastelle (Barbastella barbastellus), horseshoe bat (Rhinolophus ferrumequinum) and lesser horseshoe bat (Rhinolophus hipposideros), greater mouse-eared bat (Myotis myotis), Schreibers' miniopter (Miniopterus schreibersii), vespertilionidae (Myotis emarginatus) and bechstein's bat (Myotis bechsteinii). For all these chiropterans, the site is of importance "C", accounting for less than 2% of the known population in France.

The hibernating population count for winter 2007-2008 was 442 individuals (540 in 2008–2009), of seven different species. These included 383 great rhinolophs (409 in 2008–2009), 12 little rhinolophs (19 in 2008–2009), 41 eared vespertilts (98 in 2008–2009), 2 Bechstein's vespertilts (1 in 2008–2009) and 2 barbastelles (also 2 in 2008–2009) (the latter prefer other habitats and are very numerous and visible throughout the valley in summer). We also counted 1 brown long-eared bat (Plecotus auritus) (9 in 2008–2009) and 1 whiskered bat (Myotis mystacinus) (2 in 2008–2009).

During the summer of 2007, a series of nocturnal outings allowed to identify eleven species, some of which are not counted among the hibernants on the Chaudrolles site, in particular, Daubenton's bat (Myotis daubentonii), Natterer's bat (Myotis nattereri), serotine bat (Eptesicus serotinus), kuhl's pipistrelle (Pipistrellus kuhlii), western barbastelle (Barbastella barbastellus) and common noctule (Nyctalus noctula).

The common pipistrelle (Pipistrellus pipistrellus) is very present.

The majority of breeding sites remain unknown.

=== Invertebrates ===
The site is home to a rare invertebrate, for instance, the rosalia longicorn (Rosalia alpina), which is more or less adapted to this type of environment in the Nouvelle-Aquitaine region. It is recognized as a high-priority species, because it is "in danger of extinction on the European territory of the member states and for whose conservation the European Union bears particular responsibility".

Also present are the southern damselfly (Coenagrion mercuriale), the orange-spotted emerald (Oxygastra curtisii), Graslin's gomphe (Gomphus graslinii), the great capricorn (Cerambyx cerdo) and the european stag beetle (Lucanus cervus). The large copper (Lycaena dispar) has not been found and is thought to have disappeared.

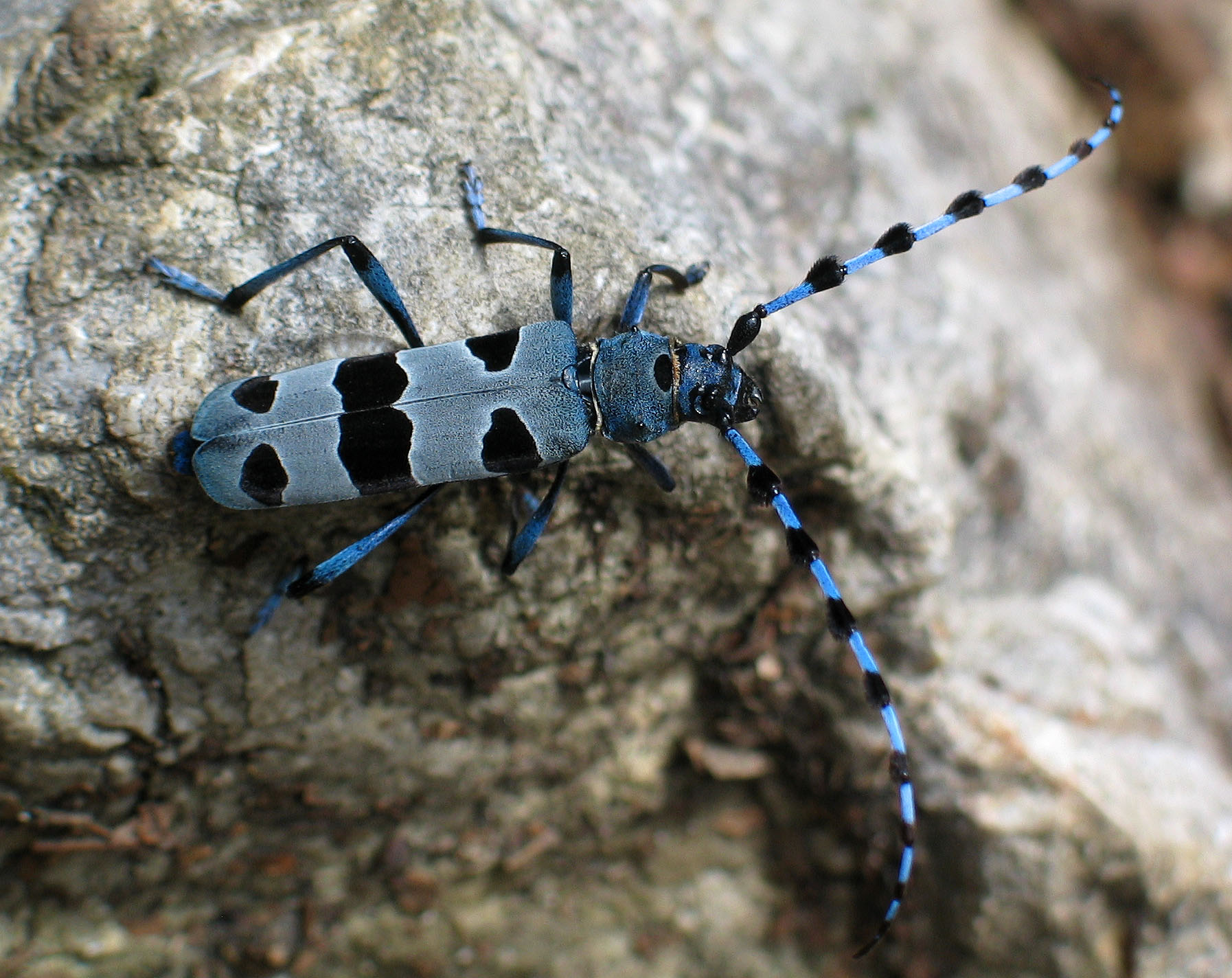
Rosalia longicorn

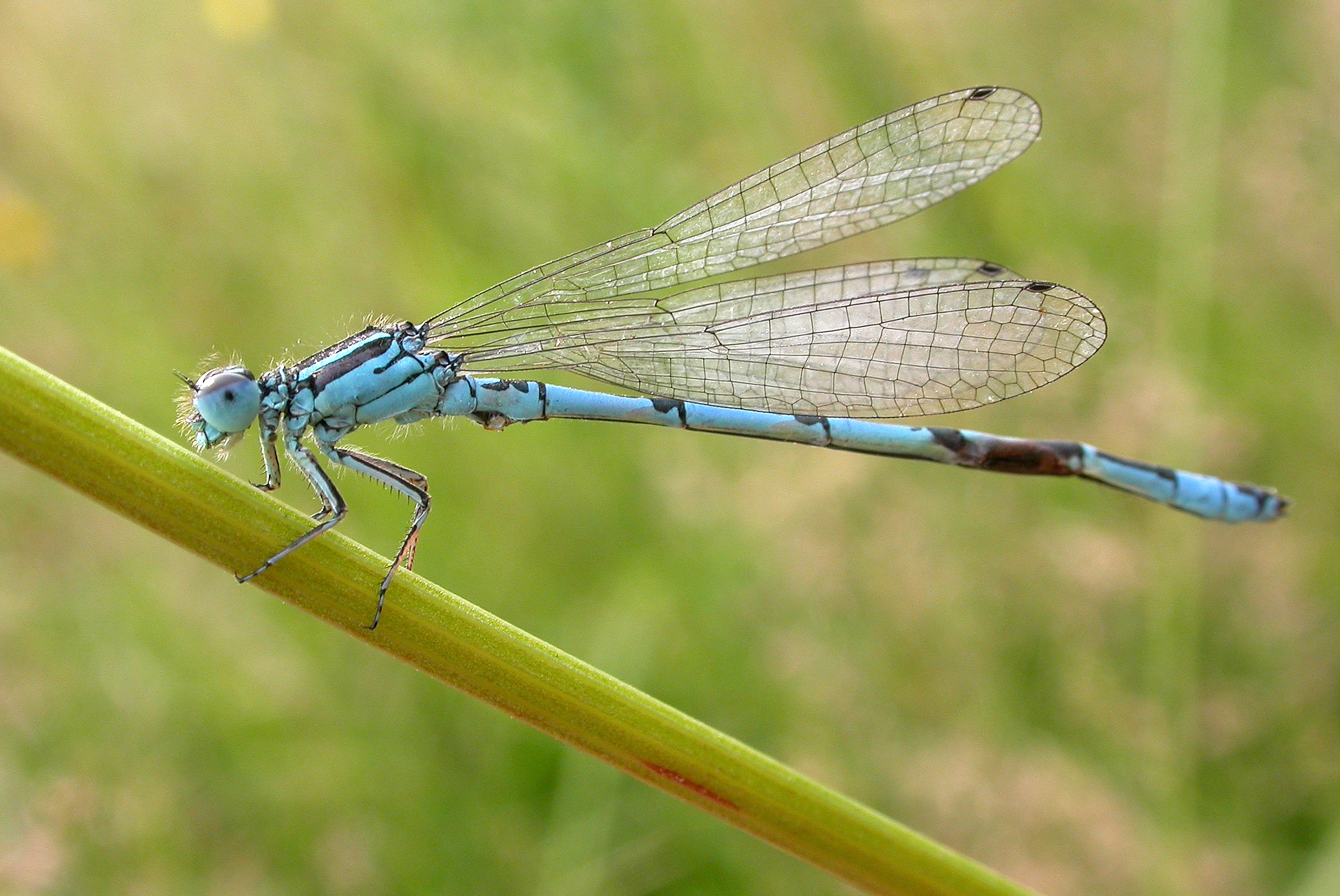
Southern damselfly

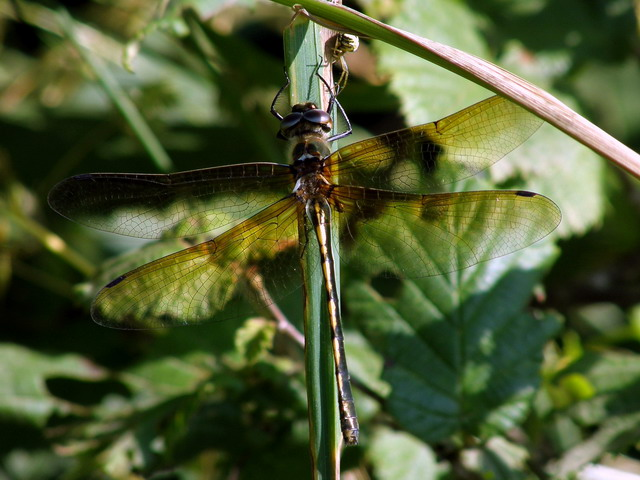
Orange-spotted emerald

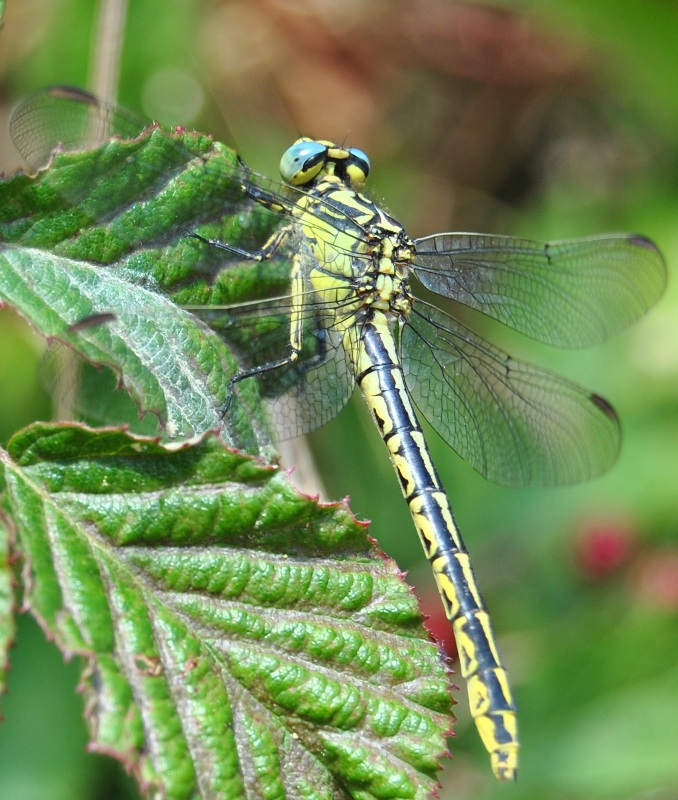
Gomphus graslinii

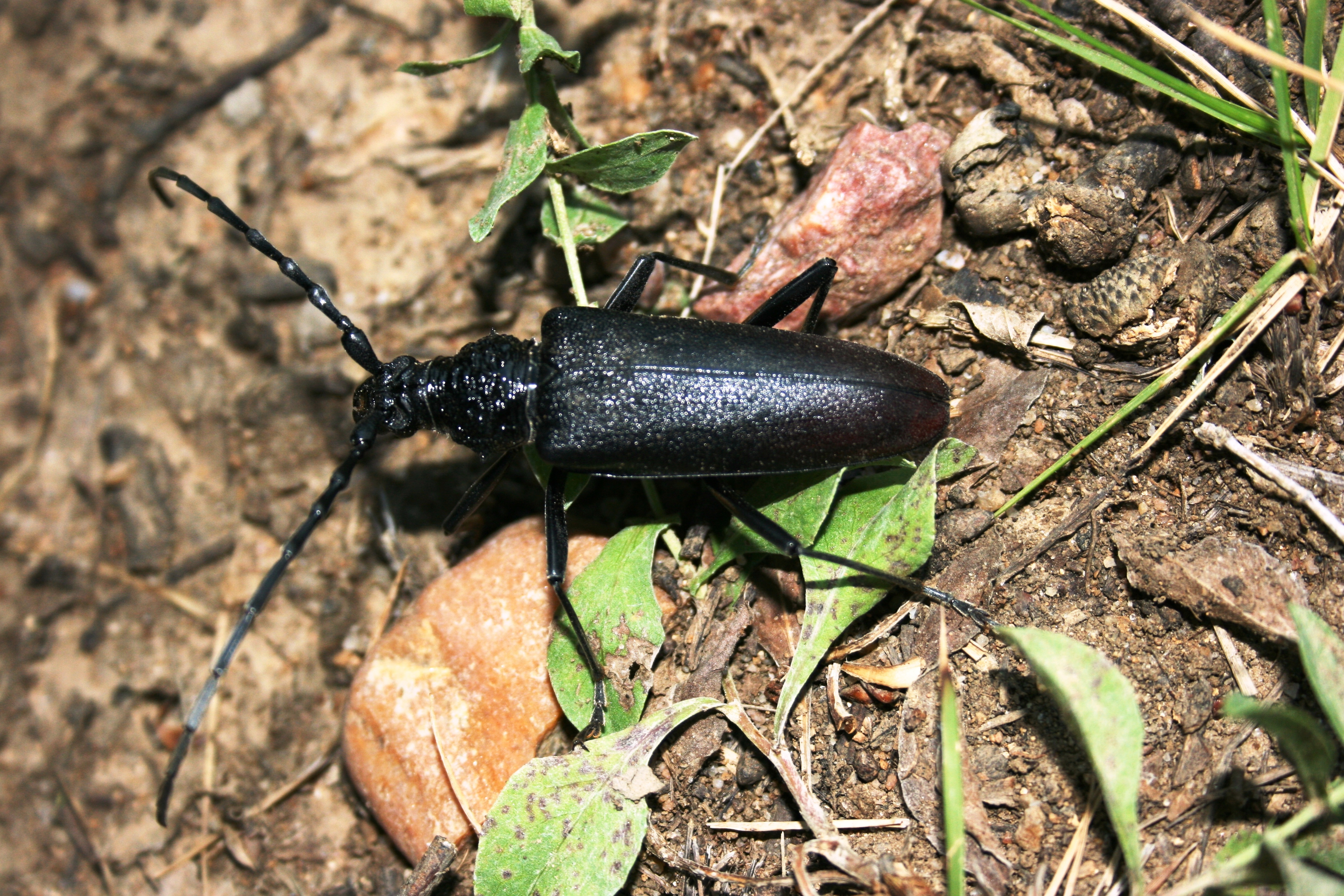
Great capricorn beetle

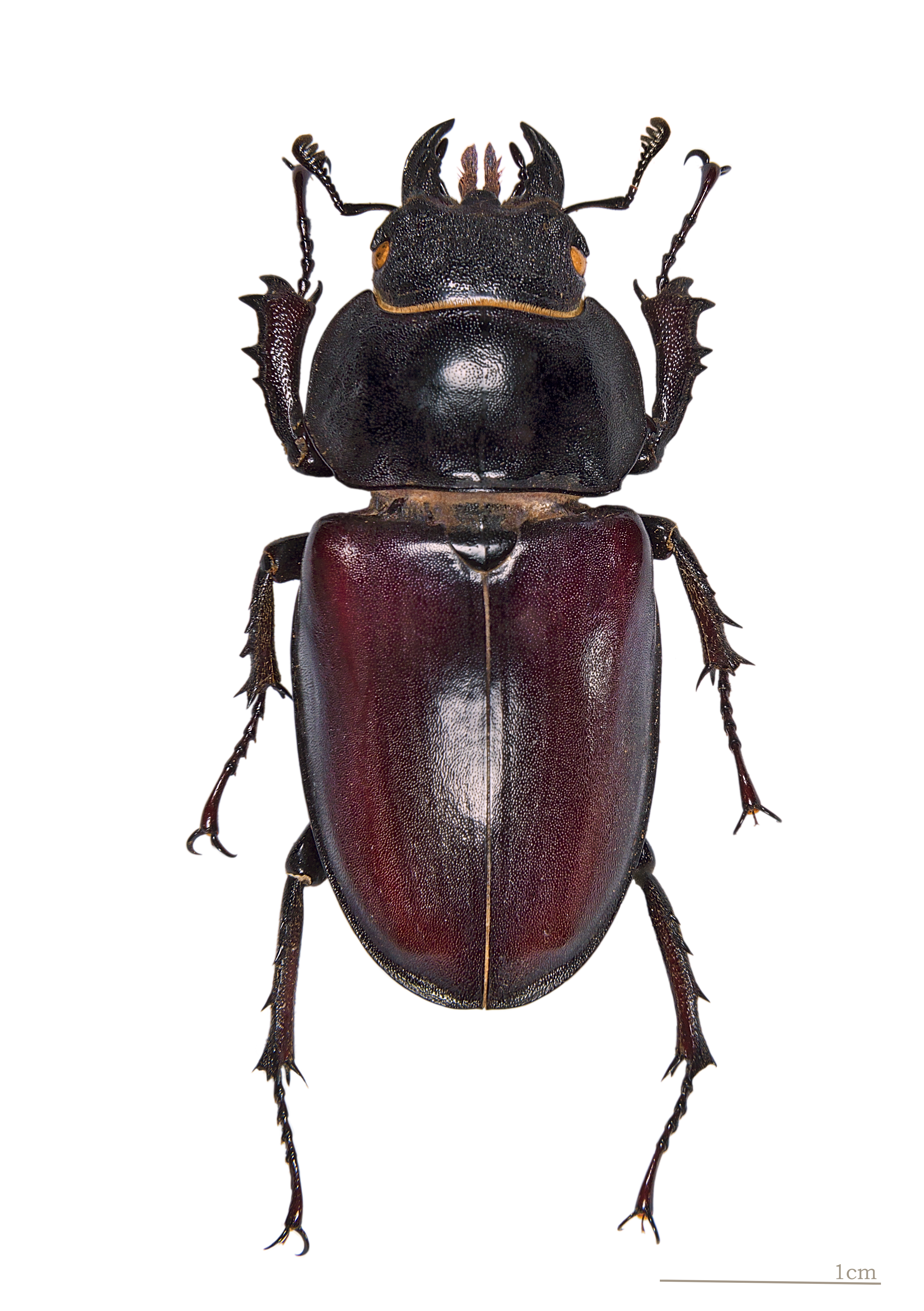
Female european stag beetle

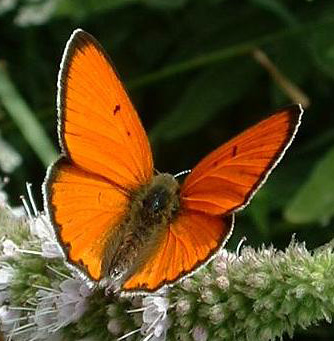
Large copper

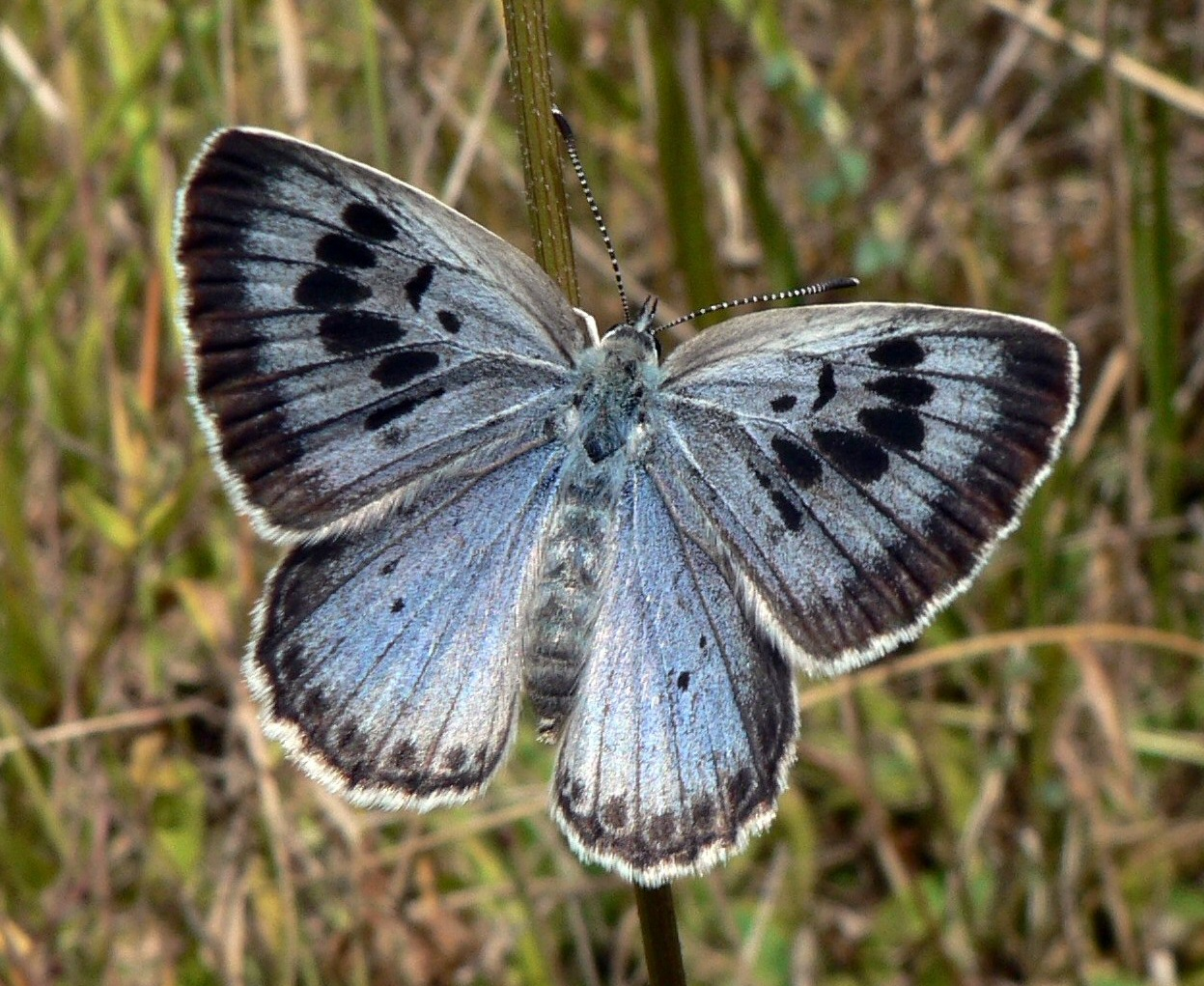
Large blue

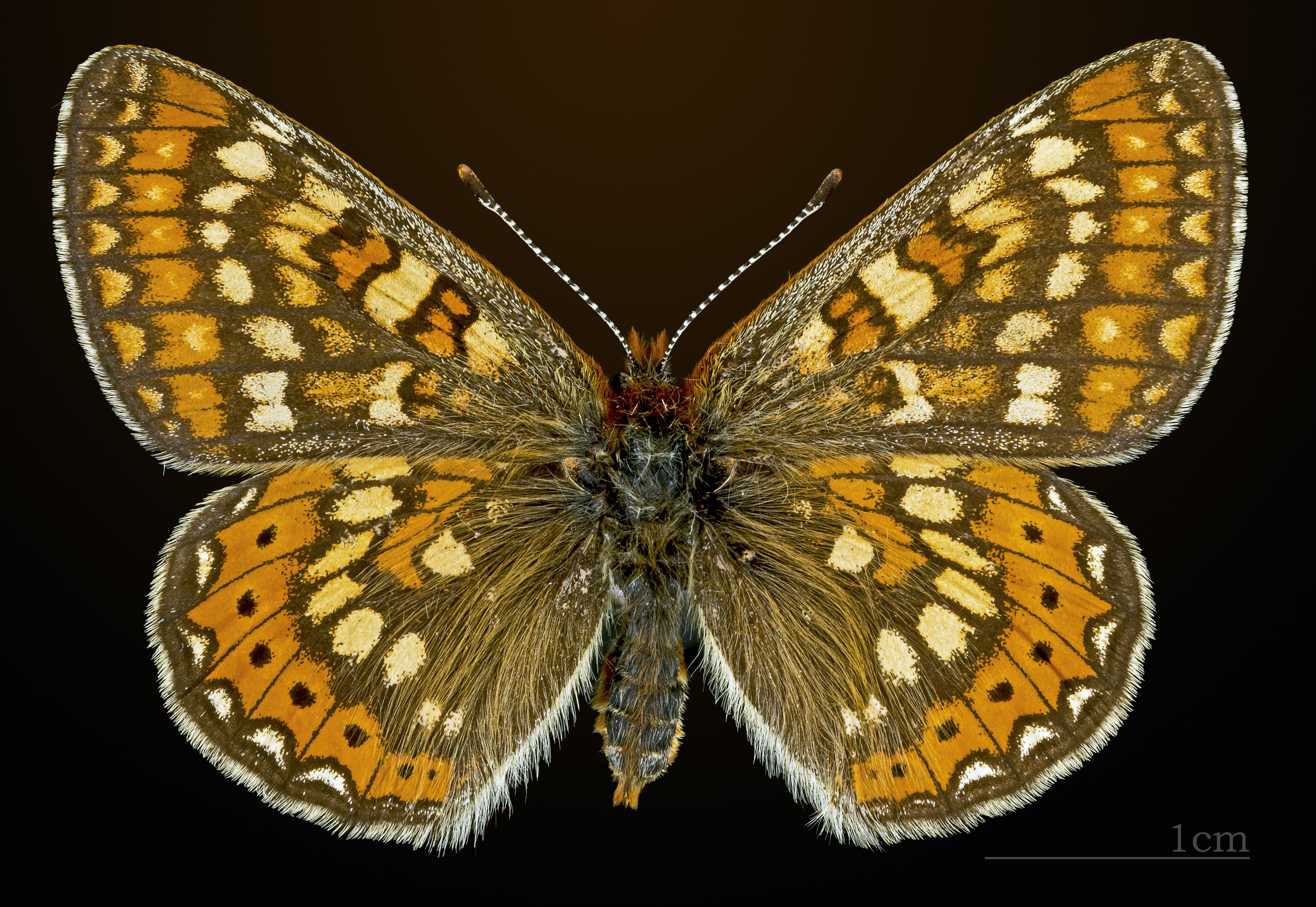
Marsh fritillary

For these species, the site is of importance "C" (presence of less than 2% of the known population in France).

Since the inventory carried out for the submission of the site's dossier, the Large blue (Phengaris arion) has been found at two sites in two communes, and the marsh fritillary (Euphydryas aurinia) at one site.

=== Fish ===
The european bullhead (Cottus gobio), brook lamprey (Lampetra planeri) and european river lamprey (Lampetra fluviatilis) are the three species of Community Interest present on the site. For these three species, the site is of importance "C" (presence of less than 2% of the known population in France).

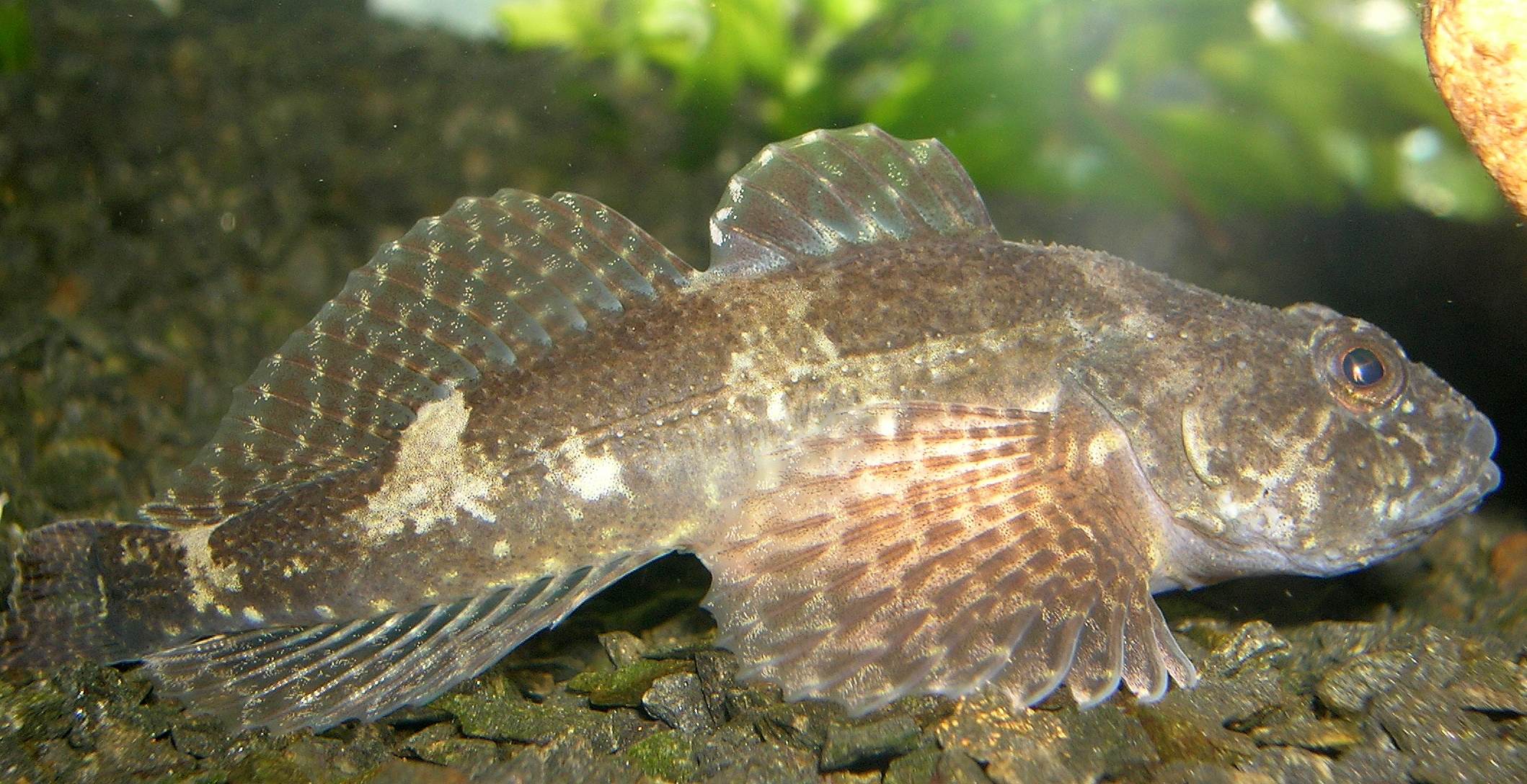
European bullhead

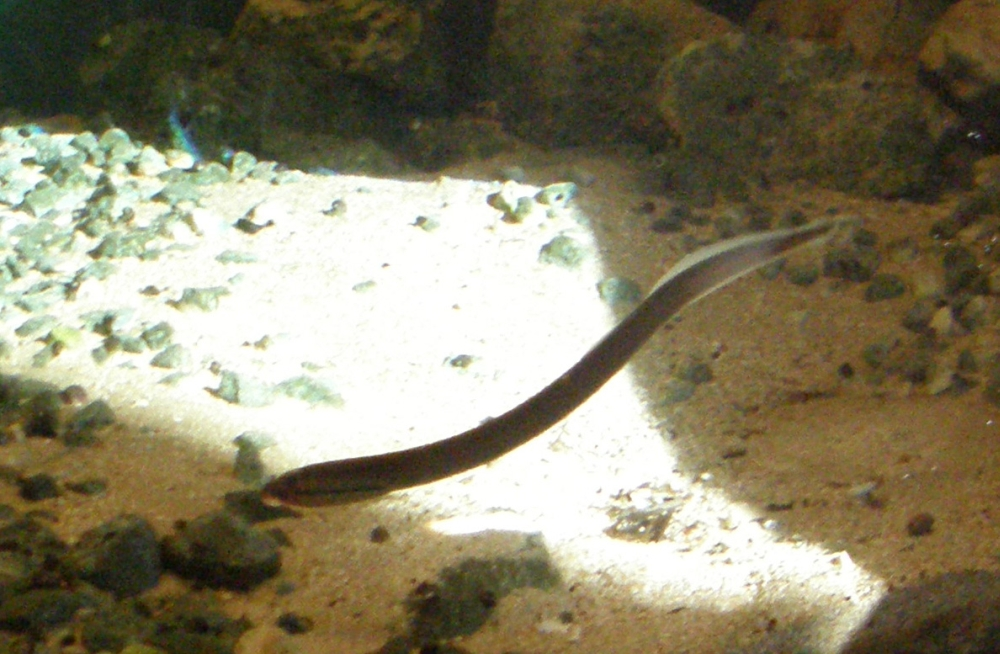
Brook lamprey

The Antenne is also classified as a 1st category river for trout fishing.

== Other species ==
=== Mammals ===
Genette and common polecat are also found on the site.

=== Birds ===
The official list includes five migratory diurnal birds of prey: the black kite (Milvus migrans), the european honey buzzard (Pernis apivorus), the marsh harrier (Circus aeruginosus), the hen harrier (Circus cyaneus) and the short-toed eagle (Circaetus gallicus), which specializes in snake hunting.

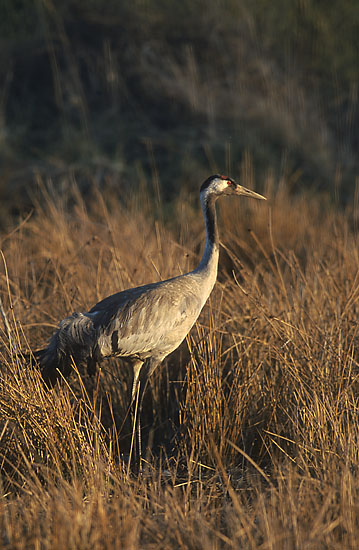
Common crane

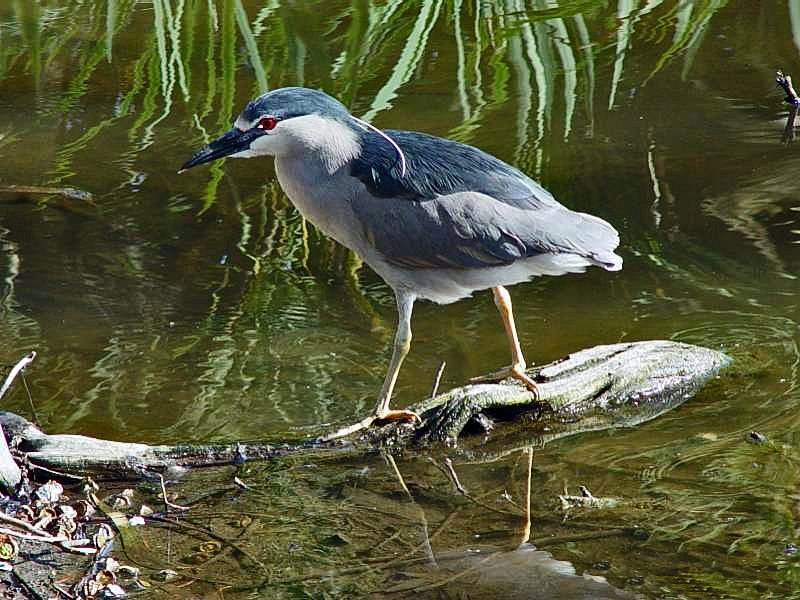
Black-crowned night heron

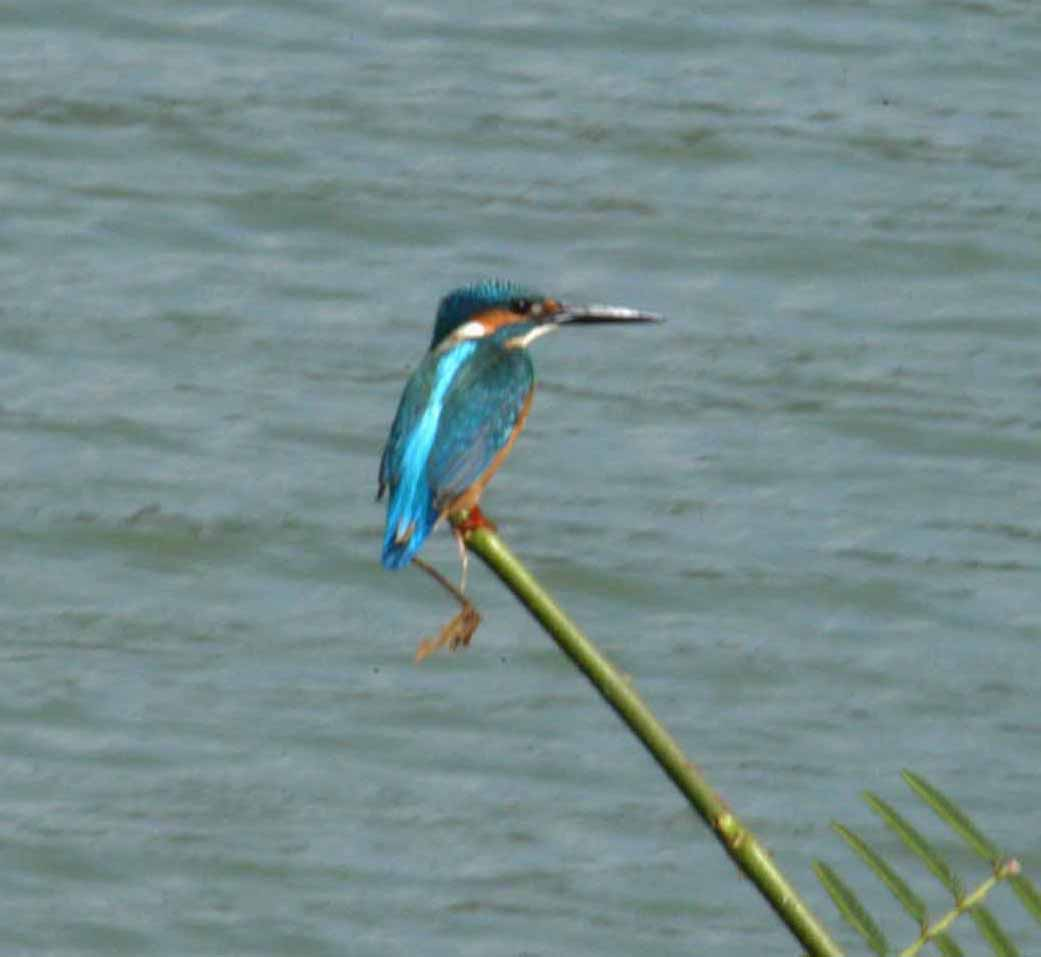
Common kingfisher

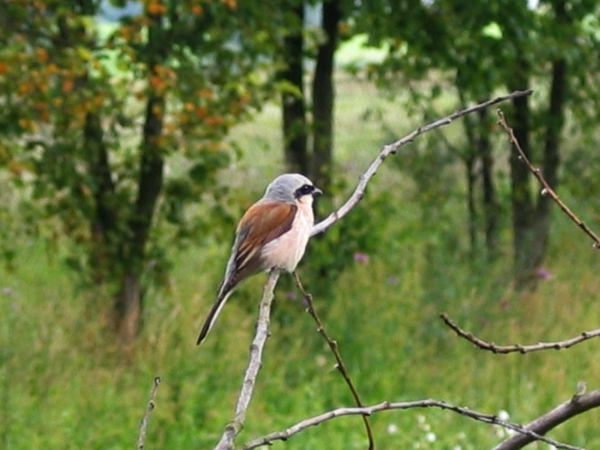
Red-backed shrike

The European nightjar (Caprimulgus europaeus), a nocturnal butterfly hunter, two wading birds, the black-crowned night heron (Nycticorax nycticorax), and the common crane (Grus grus), as well as the kingfisher (Alcedo atthis) and a passerine bird, the red-backed shrike (Lanius collurio), complete the list.

Studies by Charente-Nature (France nature environnement association) also confirm the presence of numerous other species, including diurnal birds of prey: common buzzard (Buteo buteo), eurasian sparrowhawk (Accipiter nisus), kestrel (Falco tinnunculus) and eurasian hobby (Falco subbuteo), which returns in late spring, and nocturnal raptors: tawny owl (Strix aluco), barn owl (Tyto alba) and long-eared owl (Asio otus).

Other species include eurasian skylark (Alauda arvensis) and red-legged partridges (Alectoris rufa), wood pigeons (Columba palumbus) and turtle doves (Streptopelia turtur). The grey cuckooshrike (Cuculus canorus), barn swallow (Hirundo rustica) and american black swift (Apus apus) return in spring, as does the hoopoe (Upupa epops). eurasian jays (Garrulus glandarius) are common, as are woodpeckers such as the green woodpecker (Picus viridis), the antbird (Jynx torquilla) and the great spotted woodpecker (Dendrocopos major).

Among the most common water birds we find the great cormorant (Phalacrocorax carbo), white stork (Ciconia ciconia), mute swan (Cygnus olor), little egret (Egretta garzetta), grey heron (Ardea cinerea) and purple heron (Ardea purpurea), moorhen (Gallinula chloropus), little grebe (Tachybaptus ruficollis), common snipe (Gallinago gallinago), summering common sandpiper (Actitis hypoleucos), and dense colonies of passing western cattle egret (Bubulcus ibis).

The ducks in this area are surface species such as the mallard (Anas platyrhynchos), the green-winged teal (Anas crecca) or divers such as the tufted duck (Aythya fuligula).

=== Reptiles ===
Two species of lizards, the european green lizard (Lacerta viridis) and the wall lizard (Podarcis muralis), as well as two snakes, the green whip snake (Hierophis viridiflavus) and the Aesculapian snake (Elaphe longissima) are present.

=== Amphibians ===
Amphibians are very present, with the remarkable sympatric speciation of the two French tree frogs.

These include the southern tree frog (Hyla meridionalis), the european tree frog (Hyla arborea), the common nightingale (Alytes obstetricans), the natterjack toad (Bufo calamita), the edible frog (Rana esculenta), the marsh frog (Rana ridibunda), the agile frog (Rana dalmatina) and the red-legged frog (Rana temporaria).

The marbled newt (Triturus marmoratus) is also found on the site.

=== Flora ===
Orchis odorant (Anacamptis coriophora subsp. fragrans), a subspecies of the orchis punaise, orchis pourpre (Orchis purpurea), homme-pendu (Orchis anthropophora), Guillon's biscutella (Biscutella guillonii) and Montpellier's astragalus (Astragalus monspessulanus) -the latter is protected in the Nouvelle-Aquitaine region- are typical of limestone terraces. Guillon's biscutella is highly specific to the site.

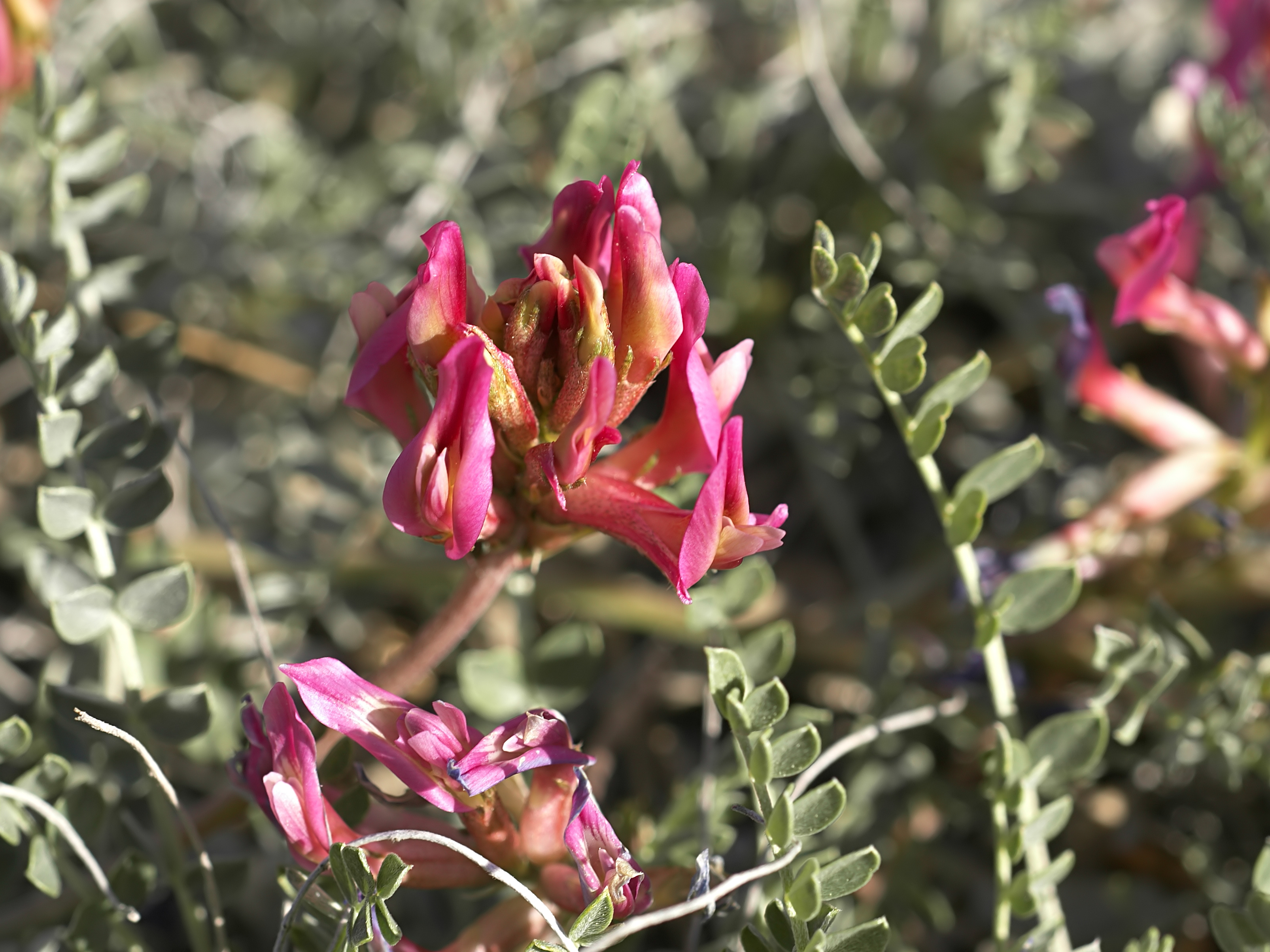
Astragalus monspessulanus

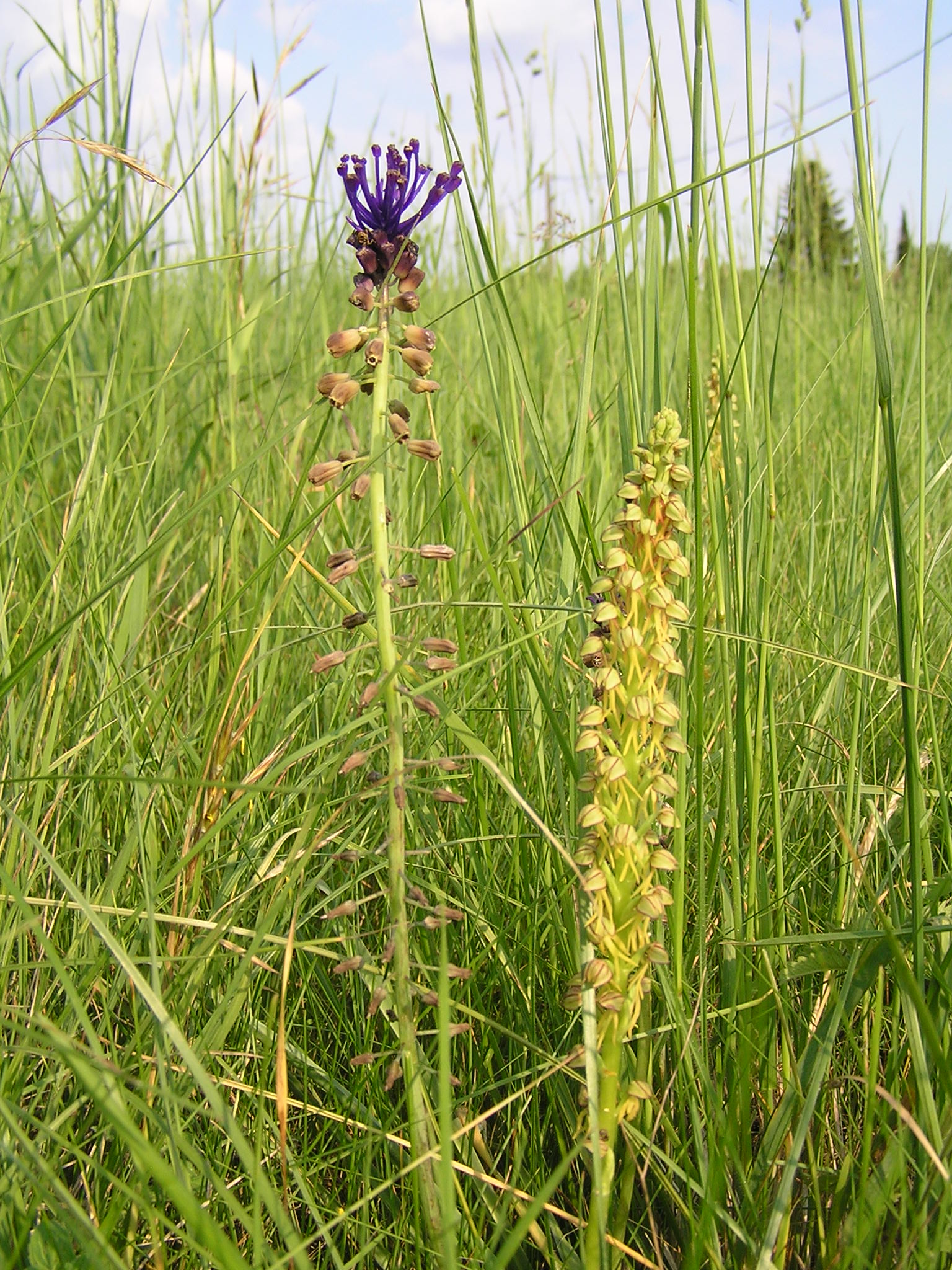
Muscari comosum and man orchid

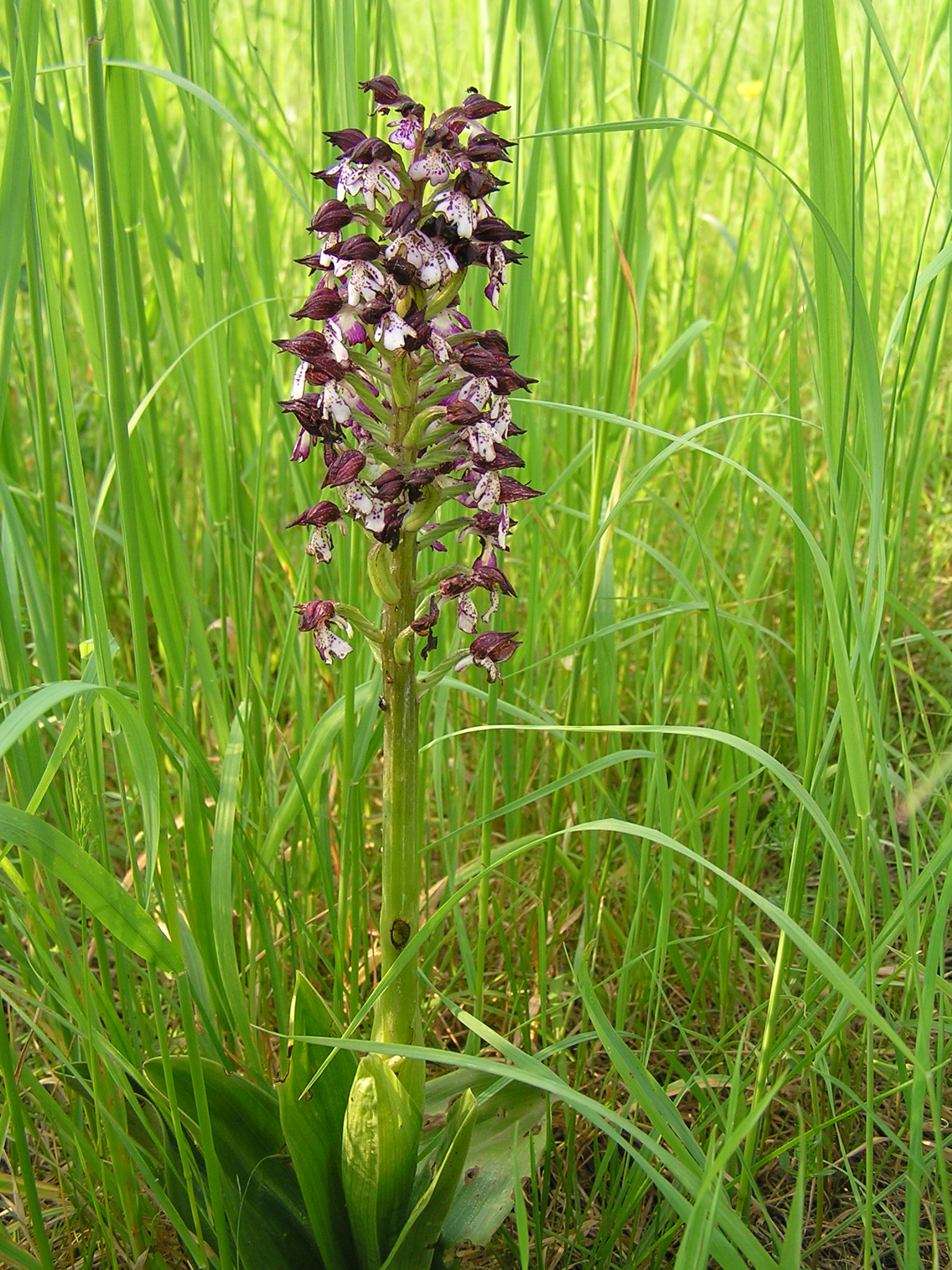
Lady orchid

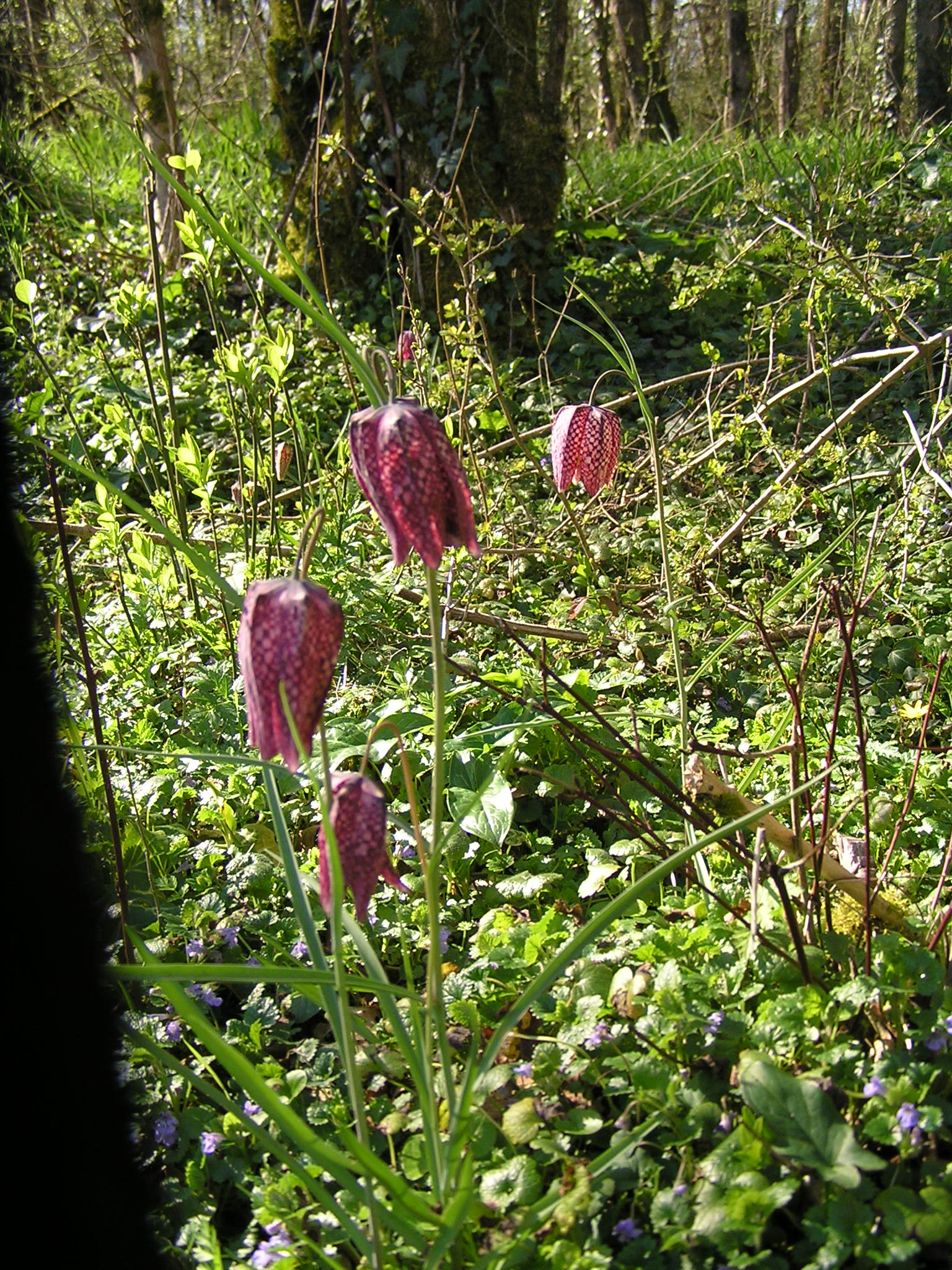
Snake's head fritillary (Fritillaria meleagris)

In the wetlands, the most noteworthy plants are the white asphodel (Asphodelus albus) and the meadow fritillary (Fritillaria meleagris), a heritage plant that was inventoried throughout the Charente department from 2005 to 2007 by Charente-Nature.

== Conservation actions ==
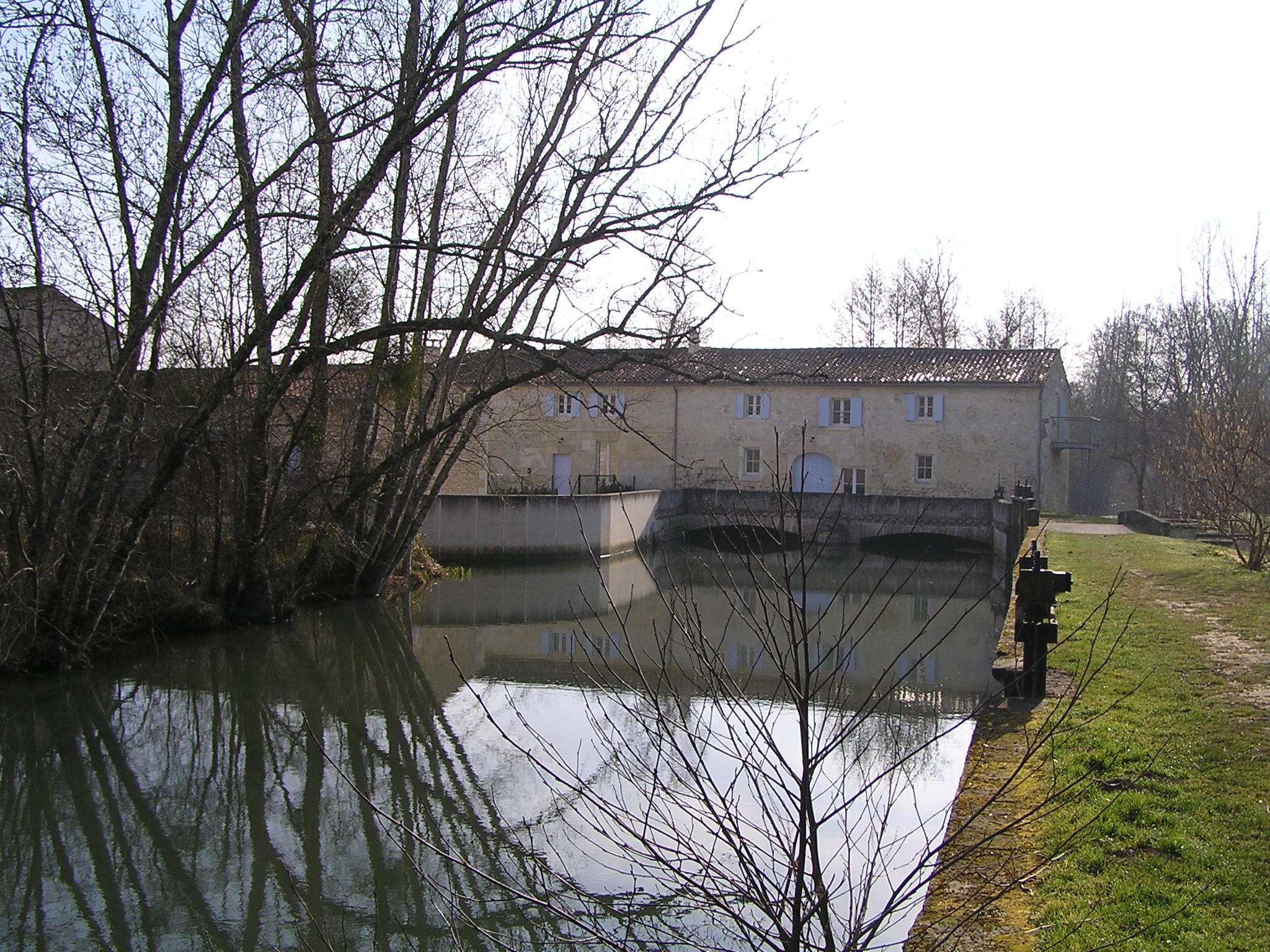
The Préziers mill seen from the roadway.

=== Stream maintenance ===
The restoration of the structures is accompanied by the installation of fish ladder and canoe crossings.

From downstream to upstream, the Buisson dam on Javrezac was rehabilitated at the end of 2008, with the return of an oxbow lake.

In 2009, work is planned at the Angeliers mill on the border between Javrezac and Richemont, and at the Basses-rues, Boussac and Bricoine mills in Cherves-Richemont, with the installation of weirs, the re-opening of arms and the construction of fish passes and canoe passages.

The structures and causeway of the Préziers mill, owned by the Communauté de communes de Cognac, have already been restored.

=== Riparian restoration ===
The regeneration of riparian zones is action E2 of the DOCOB, carried out in partnership between:

- SYMBA (syndicat mixte pour l'étude de la gestion et de l'aménagement du bassin de l'Antenne),
- the Chamber of Agriculture,
- the Adour-Garonne water agency.

Following a diagnostic study of the entire drainage basin, a "multi-year restoration and maintenance program" (PPRE) was set up. The first planting took place in 2007 along 400 m of riverbank, using a wide range of local species: high ash, black alder, acer campestre, elm, black elder, bloody dogwood, hazel, privet, and viburnum.

In all, 6200 m of riverbank were to be planted, and 3300 m completed. This is in addition to 27,986 m of brush clearing, 23560 m of pruning, and 7200 m of tree trimming.

=== Maintaining limestone grasslands ===
The commune of Saint-Sulpice-de-Cognac has signed a Natura 2000 contract. Working in partnership with volunteers from Charente Nature and the Société Française d'Orchidophilie (French Orchid Society), since 2006, it has been carrying out appropriate biennial maintenance of the calciform lawn (with the agreement of the owners). The aim is to keep the site open and favourable to rare species such as the sweet-smelling orchid (Anacamptis coriophora subsp. fragrans), Montpellier's milk-vetch and Astragalus monspessulanus.

=== Mink conservation ===
To avoid harming mink, coypu control is carried out solely by trapping with cages fitted with an escape hatch for mink. Exhaust hatch kits to bring trap cages into compliance are supplied free of charge to trappers. Chemical control using poisoned bait is prohibited.

Another risk for mink is being run over by vehicles when crossing roads. Collisions are to be prevented by the gradual installation of benches under bridges, enabling the mink to cross the road without climbing onto the carriageway. In fact, if mink can't continue on the bank, they don't go into the water, but climb back up to cross the road, something otters do less frequently.

=== Natura 2000 Chart ===
A Natura 2000 charter is signed on a parcel-by-parcel basis for a five-year period, and enables the landowner to contractually commit to good management practices in return for an exemption from the communal share of the Taxe sur le Foncier Non-Bâti (TFNB) on the parcel.

General recommendations include a commitment not to destroy community habitats and species, not to make any additions to the site (in particular fillings), and to allow site coordinators access to the site. Contractors and service providers must be informed of the contents of the charter. Phytosanitary treatments are forbidden without special authorization from the technical committee. Work must be carried out on recommended dates (mowing after June 15 or July 25, for example).

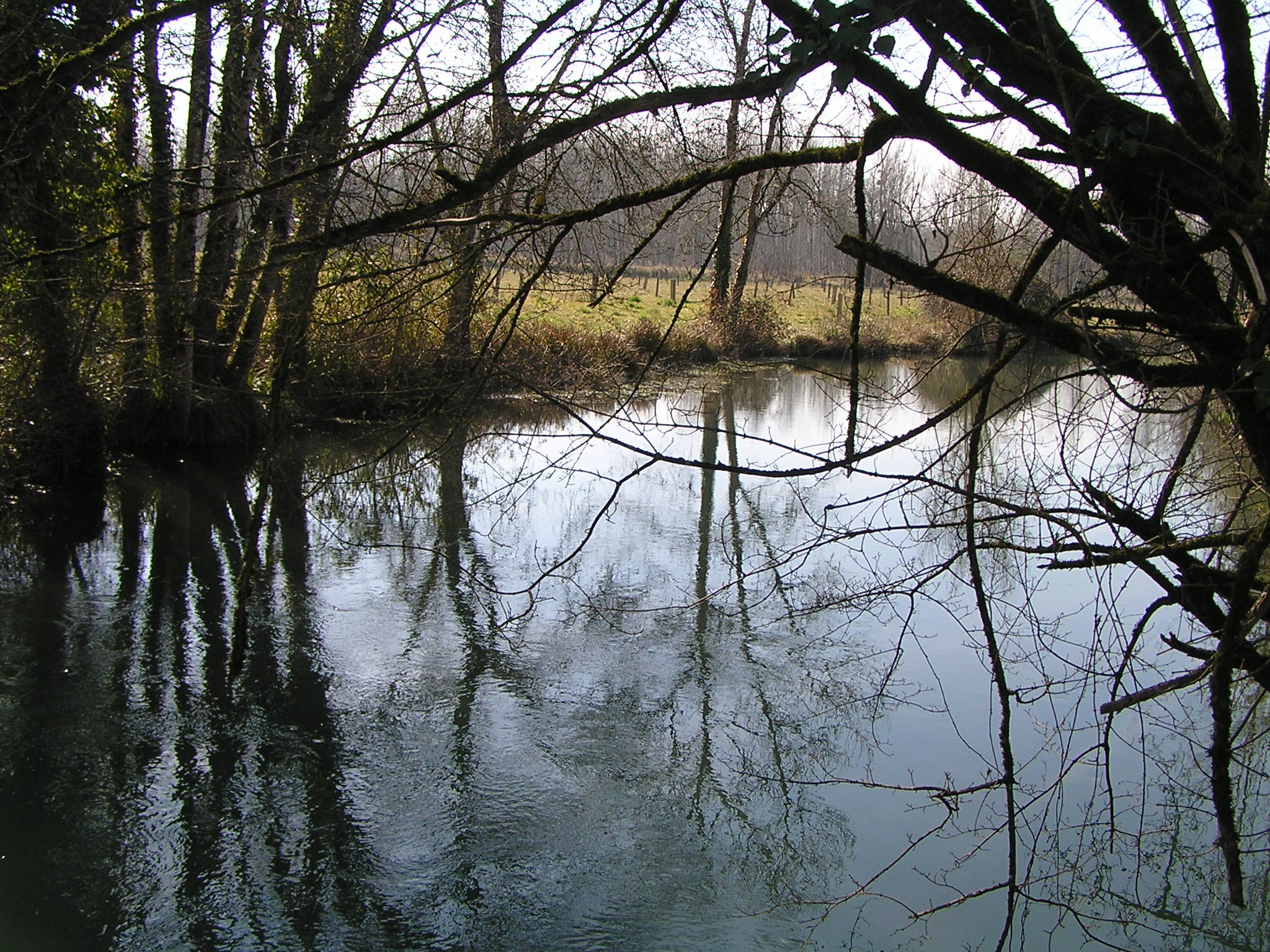
The Antenne at Le Seure.

There are charters for "rivers and streams", "low-lying floodplains", "spontaneous alluvial woodlands", "production woodlands", "mixed woodlands", "thermophilic holm oak woodlands", "riparian forests", "hedgerow maintenance and restoration", "hay meadows", "calciferous grasslands", "underground cavities and bat breeding sites".

Other sheets are aimed at local authorities and businesses: "maintenance of hiking trails", "maintenance of roadsides and paths", "maintenance of structures", "maintenance of energy and communication networks". They were all adopted on February 25, 2009.

== Diffusion ==
This has been achieved through "InfoSite" newsletters, edited by the LPO and distributed to local communities and on the Internet.

A website was under development, due to go online at the end of 2009.

== See also ==
=== Related articles ===
- Natura 2000
- fr:Liste des sites Natura 2000 de la Charente
- fr:Liste des sites Natura 2000 de la Charente-Maritime
- fr:Liste des zones naturelles d'intérêt écologique, faunistique et floristique de la Charente
- Antenne

=== External links ===
- L'Antenne valley website archive
- Antenne Nature Loisirs Patrimoine association website archive
- Website of SYMBA, the river syndicate archive
- Décret n° 2001-1031 du 8 novembre 2001 archive on the procedure for designating Natura 2000 sites and amending the rural code (articles R. 214-15 à R. 214–22)
- Décret n° 2001-1216 du 20 décembre 2001 archive on the procedure for designating Natura 2000 sites and amending the rural code (articles R. 214-23 à R. 214–39)
- Site file archive on INPN

=== Bibliography ===
- ^{[PDF]} InfoSite no. 1 archive, December 2005.
- ^{[PDF]} InfoSite no. 2 archive, December 2006.
- ^{[PDF]} InfoSite no. 3 archive, December 2007.
