= Coleophora valesianella =

Scientific classification
- Kingdom: Animalia
- Phylum: Arthropoda
- Clade: Pancrustacea
- Class: Insecta
- Order: Lepidoptera
- Family: Coleophoridae
- Genus: Coleophora
- Species: C. valesianella

Binomial name
- Coleophora valesianella Zeller, 1849

Synonyms
- Coleophora giraudi Ragonot, 1874

Species of moth

Coleophora valesianella is a moth of the family Coleophoridae. It is found in Europe south of the line running from France to Austria and Romania. It has also been recorded in Cyprus.

The larvae feed on Astragalus aristatus, Astragalus monspessulanus and Hippocrepis species. Larvae can be found from autumn to spring of the following year.
