= Antenne =

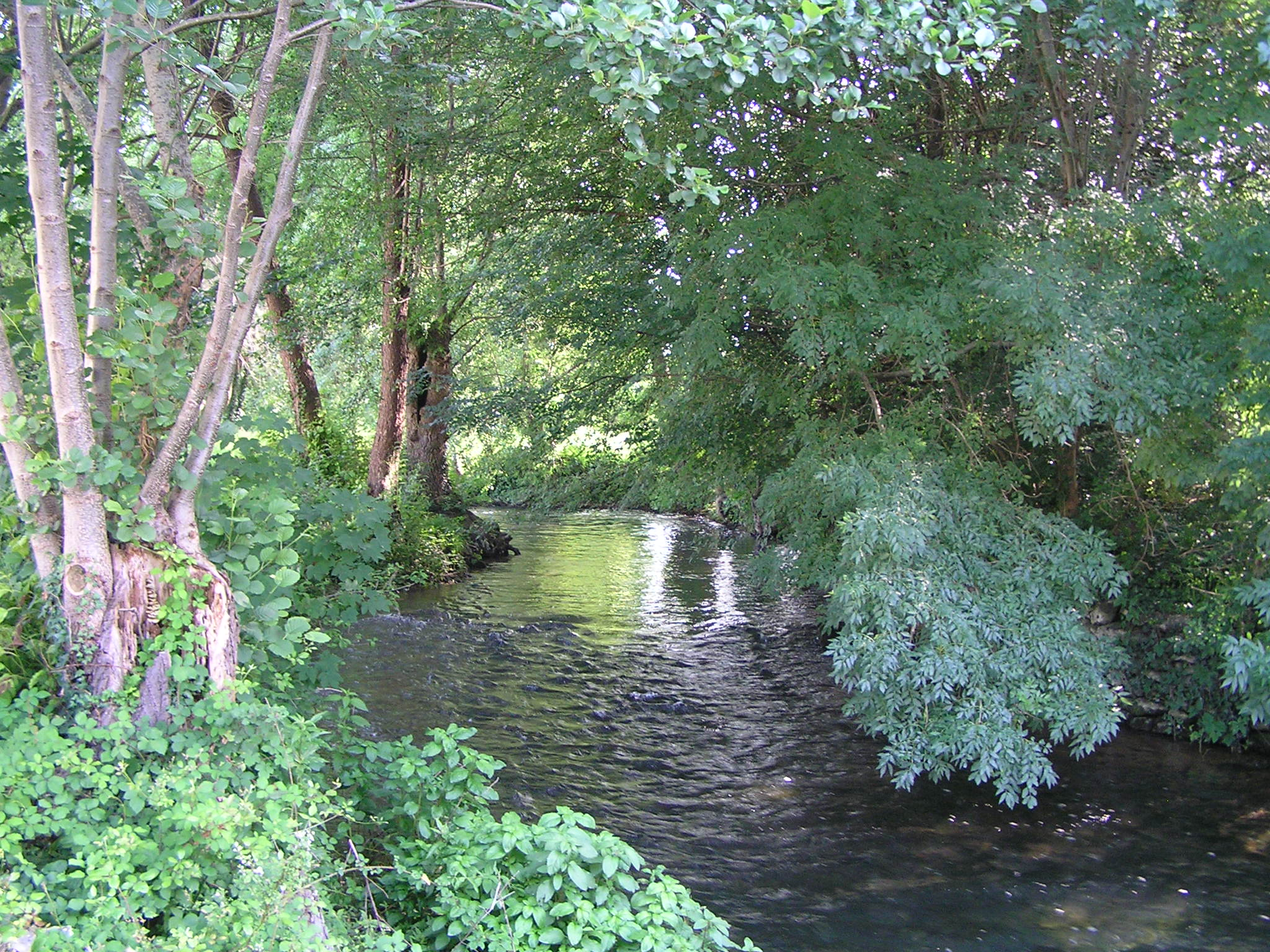
- Antenne in Javrezac

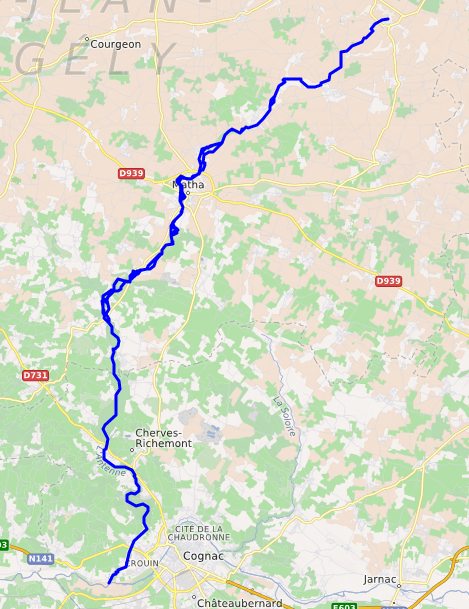

Location
- Country: France

Physical characteristics
- Source
  - location: Charente-Maritime
- Mouth
  - location: Charente, Javrezac
  - coordinates: 45°40′51″N 0°22′24″W
- Length: 49.0 km (30.4 mi)

Basin features
- Progression: Charente→ Atlantic Ocean

The Antenne (French pronunciation: [ɑ̃tɛn]) is a 49.0 km long river in the Charente-Maritime département, in southwestern France. Its source is in the commune of Fontaine-Chalendray. It flows into the Charente near Cognac.

In its middle and lower reaches, the river forms a natural landscape which is a nature preservation area, registered under the Natura 2000 network (FR5400473).
