= Populiculture =

Poplar cultivation agriculture

Populiculture is the name given to various types of cultivation in artificial poplar stands (Populus sp.), on the fringe between agriculture and forestry. Its manager is called a "poplar farmer".

Their ease of planting, rapid growth, and natural affinity for very wet, but not swampy, biotopes make them one of the most widely cultivated species in France, Belgium and the Netherlands, as well as in many former wetlands.

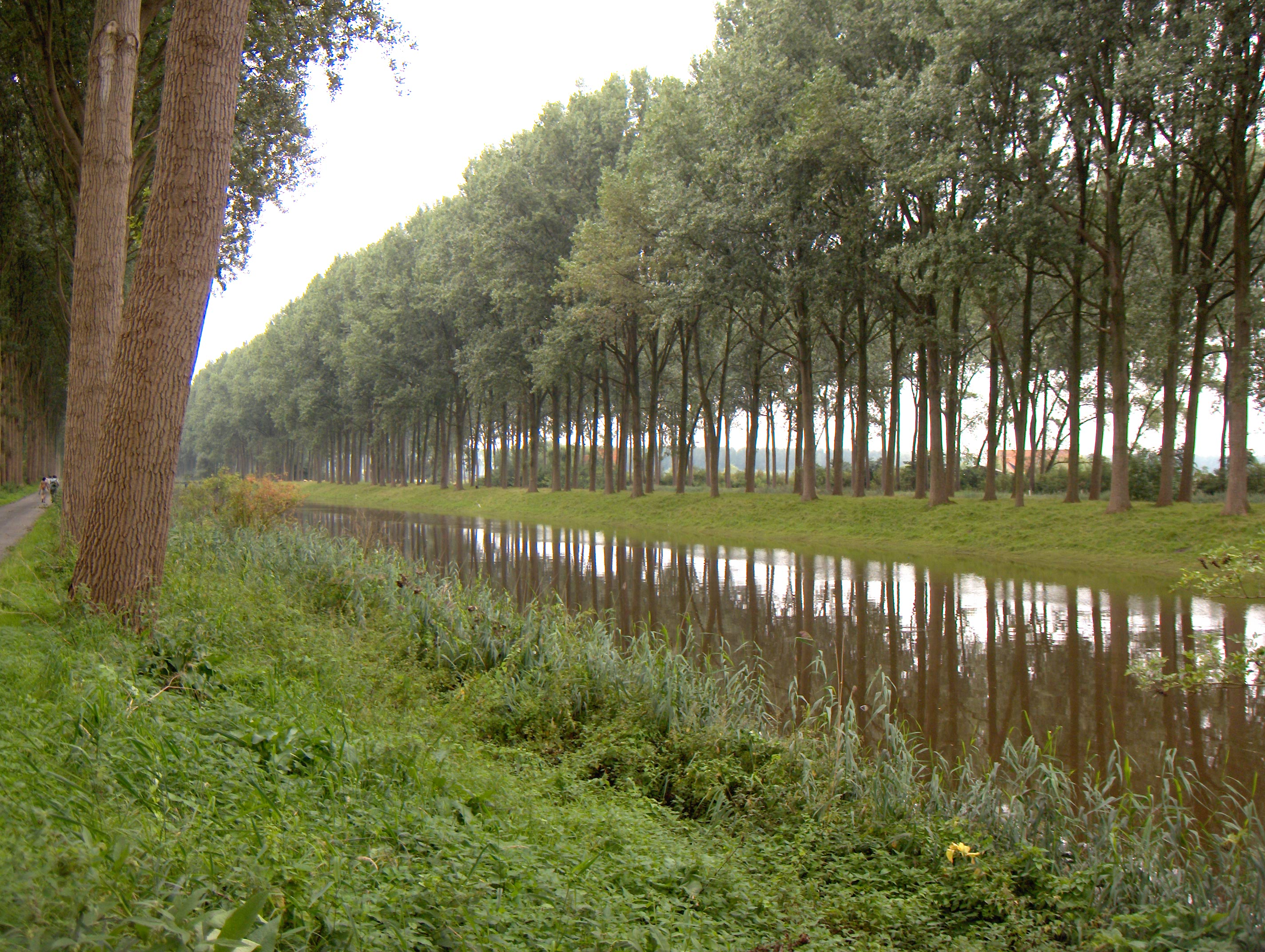
Canal owners or managers (including VNF in France) sometimes rent out their banks or banksides to growers. These trees, typical of canal landscapes, were once used to produce matches.

To boost their growth, poplars (varieties or cultivars resulting from hybridization between poplars of European or American origin, generally first selected for their rapid growth) are sometimes planted on soil prepared by subsoiling or ploughing, often after weeding and sometimes fertilizing and drainage using techniques more reminiscent of agriculture than forestry.

== Two main segments ==
In wood-material production, the "revolution" (the period between planting and felling) of poplar used to be around fifty years. With the new clones and hybrids selected for their productivity, it is now closer to twenty years, or even 15, but fast-growing varieties are often susceptible to various diseases, including poplar rust.

Outlets include light packaging (crates, cheese boxes, etc.), plywood, paper mills, and particle board factories, while the larger logs are used to make veneer and plywood (peeled wood).

This is one of the few species that the same owner can plant and harvest during his lifetime, or even several times in his lifetime.

== Revolution ==
The selection of increasingly fast-growing cultivars has at least halved the revolution in poplar plantations.

Transgenic poplars are being or have been tested, in North America and in France in particular, with poplars intended for energy production and poplars potentially destined for the paper industry, as well as with short rotation coppice or very short rotation coppice, with harvesting at 4 or 5 years, followed by regrowth and by pruning.

With the development of the wood fuel sector, research organizations have become interested in poplar management using short rotation coppice (6 to 8 years) and very short rotation coppice (2 to 3 years). Harvested using an adapted forage harvester, the poplar grove is then finely shredded to produce biomass. Abandoned for a time due to low profitability and competition from willow, soaring energy costs could revive trials on this management method, which is not specific to poplar.

In such intensive monocultures, however, it has the disadvantage of exhausting the soil and encouraging attacks by certain fungi or insects normally or abnormally associated with these poplars, but likely to proliferate under intensive cultivation conditions, and to which high-yield poplars are often more vulnerable.

Various countries have been experimenting with spreading sewage sludge (dry or liquid) on poplar crops for several decades.

== Poplar and the environment ==
In monospecific, even-aged stands, however, poplar plantations can be highly vulnerable to disease and defoliation, as well as to storms and drought.

Poplar plantations are often presented as detrimental to the environments in which they are established, not so much because of the species itself, but because they are planted in even-aged monocultures, often monoclonal and often on agricultural land. These three conditions are not conducive to the expression of biodiversity and the ecopotentiality of the site, while at the same time favoring contagious tree-to-tree diseases and outbreaks of phytophagous insects (including defoliators). In particular, poplar rusts have reached unprecedented levels in several French regions since the 1990s.

In some cases, these problems have led to the massive use of pesticides, either as aerial dusting or spraying or from the ground in 1952, with the former use of highly toxic, non-degradable pesticides such as lead arsenate.

What's more, thanks to the rapid growth and high evapotranspiration of its species, poplar cultivation has often been used to modify very wet areas (creation of drainage ditches, lowering of water tables, pumping for urbanization). This practice has created an image of poplar cultivation that is not environmentally friendly. Urban planning documents often stipulate that it is forbidden to plant or replant poplars, and only poplars, "whereas the reasons given (disappearance of certain plant species from open environments, impact on water quality in rivers and ponds, modification of the initial ecosystem...) are the natural consequences of the closure of the environment by the presence of trees, not just poplars." Limitations on this stand are only justified for specific environments or particular contexts.

Poplars also have a bad reputation for causing allergies. However, male poplars produce small quantities of pollen, which is of little or no allergenic value. Female poplars produce low-allergenic but highly visible fruiting cotton, wrongly associated with grass pollen, which appears at the same time of year and is highly allergenic but much less visible.

By consuming too much water, poplars dry out the soil. These hydrophilic species have a "luxury water consumption" due to their high density of stomata (present on both sides of the leaves) and, above all, their poor transpiration regulation. Although these species are adapted to environments with abundant water resources, studies on an entire poplar grove invalidate this assumption. The superficial rooting of poplars, their lower leaf area index, and their phenology mean that "the actual evapotranspiration of a poplar stand on wet sites is lower than that of an alluvial forest, and that of a poplar stand on a well-drained plateau site would still be equivalent to, or even lower than, that of an oak grove."

Because of their shallow roots, poplar plantations are accused of undermining riverbanks, causing them to collapse, and clogging riverbeds with trees, a possible source of ice jams. The most recent studies show that the majority of poplar species do not merit these criticisms.

Earlier studies suggested that poplar was one of the most harmful species for fish farming, its leaves being blamed for deoxygenation the water and releasing substances toxic to fish. This impact exists regardless of tree species, and only in the case of stagnant or low-flow water.

=== Agroforestry ===
Numerous intercropping practices were recognized as beneficial to the development of poplar plantations: weed crops in the early years, corn, sunflower and beans. The hyper-specialization of the late 20th century led to a decline in these practices.

=== Genetic diversity ===
"Natural" or "semi-natural" poplar plantations, made up of more or less indigenous species and varieties, still exist locally, generally in wetlands far from or on the outskirts of agricultural areas. Their purpose is to preserve the genetic and expressive potential of natural poplar plantations. However, in Western Europe, and in France (Europe's leading poplar producer and the world's second-largest after China, with Picardy being the leading French region in terms of surface area and volume), true wild poplar stands have themselves become rare in many of their native regions, as they have in Asia and much of North America. Thus, for example, the black poplar once so abundant in northern France and Belgium seems to have almost disappeared from departments where it was still common a few decades ago.

Where it is still locally present, it sometimes has a very impoverished genetic diversity (as a result of clones replanted in the 20th century). In addition, there is spontaneous genetic introgression and hybridization between wild and introduced poplars and genetic pollution of wild populations from the hundreds of thousands of clones introduced into poplar plantations, as demonstrated for example for P. nigra in Belgium by paternity analyses carried out in the field.

The fauna, flora, and fungi of a poplar grove vary considerably according to the age of the plantations, the fertility of the site, and the management of the undergrowth.

However, a certain "renaturation" of poplar plantations seems possible if the management method allows it. In that case, the undergrowth and edges of these stands can spontaneously colonize the herbaceous stratum with other trees, bushes or lianas, which can facilitate "conversion" to other types of woodland. According to a team of researchers from the Ghent's University Forestry Laboratory and the Institute for Forestry and Game Management, a "traditional" poplar grove of little ecological value, in more "natural" stands", can be facilitated by the "spontaneous development of autochthonous species", particularly if the parameters determining this renaturation are better understood. One study examined the degree of spontaneous recolonization of 175 poplar plantations (in Belgium) and concluded that spontaneous development was "often so important that it can be used as a basis for stand transformation. For some species, the "forest age" parameter determines this development, i.e. the period during which the site has been managed as a poplar stand" (the older the site and the closer it is to harvesting, the less frequent and significant the disturbance due to maintenance). "The establishment of other species can be used to develop mixed, well-structured, multifunctional stands of greater ecological, recreational and aesthetic value".

As the frequency and intensity of maintenance work diminish, annual species, generally pioneer at first, then perennial grassland, and finally more typically sylvatic (mainly woody), with (in Belgium, according to available data) a corresponding increase in phytomass (from 250g to 1 kg per square meter, and up to 2 kg/m^{2}) in the oldest and least maintained poplar groves. Studies of abandoned poplar plantations have revealed a significant accumulation of phytomass near the trees, with species (number and variety) depending on the levels of disturbance caused by successive past maintenance. This suggests that "the enrichment of the flora by maturation allows the appearance of more stable, longer-lived species" (a phenomenon only observed in the oldest poplar plantations), and perhaps of interest in terms of carbon sinks and ecological resilience.

Poplar is the species on which transgenesis has been most extensively tested solely in the laboratory, despite a very complex and large genome, which has also been the most extensively studied among trees.

GMO poplars (interspecific hybrid Populus tremula x P. alba, female clones of the subspecies Cultivar/INRA line #717-1B4) have been created and tested by INRA (after authorization for release) since the 1990s, with the hope of producing low-lignin wood of interest to papermakers, or so-called second-generation biofuels, or that it can secrete an insecticide (Bt), resist selective weedkillers, or grow in arid zones, especially in North America. One experiment is being conducted in France by INRA at Saint-Cyr-en-Val (Loiret)... These experiments are highly controversial, notably for their risk of genetic pollution following cross-breeding with normal poplars. INRA requested and obtained an initial authorization to extend the experiment (for testing on an industrial scale) and a second request to study "the properties of the wood to complete their agronomic and environmental assessment and to evaluate their wood for a new use: bioenergy production."

In 2013 INRA requested a further extension of its field trial. The Economic, Ethical, and Social Committee of the High Council on Biotechnology issued a negative opinion, considering, in particular, that growing GM poplars for agrofuels would conflict with agricultural land or biodiversity. InfOGM has deciphered the CEES recommendation.

== France ==
Poplar plantations are highly developed in France, particularly in regions rich in wetlands and north of Paris (Picardy, Nord Pas-de-Calais). Poplar cultivation in alluvial zones has been described since 1875: the Peuplier Blanc du Poitou (Populus serotina, a hybrid between the European black poplar and the American black poplar), introduced around 1850 in the hinterland of the Marais Poitevin, gradually replaced the "Charpes", spontaneous black poplars, from 1875 onwards.

In all regions poplar stands are unevenly distributed across cantons and departments.

In the Nord department, for example, poplar plantations covered around 18,000 hectares in the early 2000s, i.e. almost twice the size of the region's largest state forest (Forêt de Mormal), but with a highly variable rate (almost 0% in the Dunkirk area, compared with 1.3% in the Nord and 0.7% in the Pas-de-Calais, according to the Agreste-SAA survey, 2002).

France is Europe's leading poplar producer. Although poplars account for no more than 3% of the country's hardwood forest area, on an annual average they supply more than 20% of its timber production (mainly peeled wood).

In the early 2000s poplar plantations accounted for almost 22 mm^{3} of standing area and annual production of around 2.8 mm^{3}/year.

The timber harvest is 2.1 mm^{3}/year, and is declining.

This would leave 800,000 mm^{3}, partly used for industrial timber.

== See also ==
- Willow
- Silviculture
- Short rotation coppice
- Melampsora

== Bibliography ==
- Josse-Alaterre, G (2013). "2013: Bois durable de Picardie: le peuplier, tant de talents à découvrir Alim'agri". Magazine du Ministère de l'agriculture, de l'agroalimentaire et de la forêt. No. 1555. pp. 32–34.
