= Mesnac =

- Commune
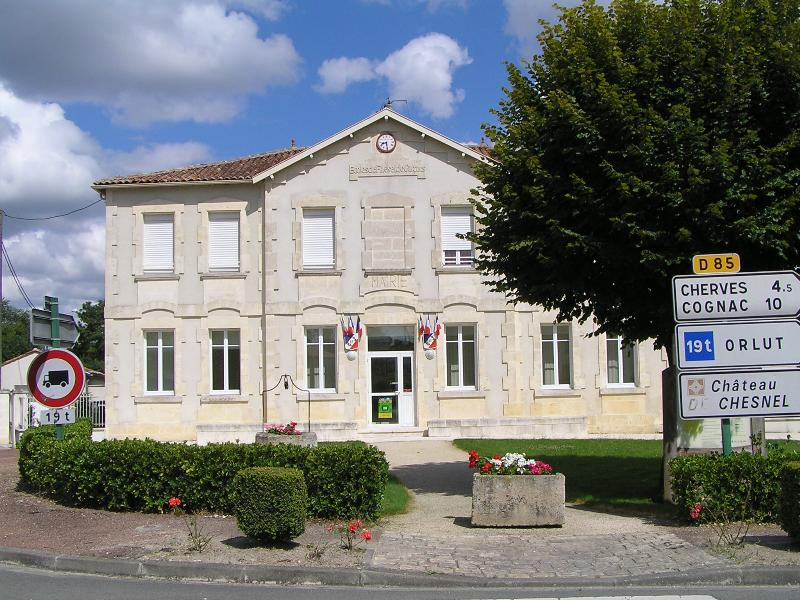
- Town hall
- Location of Mesnac
- Location within France Location within Nouvelle-Aquitaine
- Coordinates: 45°46′40″N 0°20′32″W
- Country: France
- Region: Nouvelle-Aquitaine
- Department: Charente
- Arrondissement: Cognac
- Canton: Cognac-1
- Intercommunality: CA Grand Cognac

Government
  - Mayor (2020–2026): Didier Jean Gois
- Area^{1}: 6.51 km^{2} (2.51 sq mi)
- Elevation: 25 m (82 ft)
- Highest elevation: 25 m (82 ft)
- Lowest elevation: 10 m (33 ft)
- Population (2023): 404
  - Density: 62.1/km^{2} (161/sq mi)
- Time zone: UTC+01:00 (CET)
  - Summer (DST): UTC+02:00 (CEST)
- INSEE/Postal code: 16218 /16370
- ^{1} French Land Register data, which excludes lakes, ponds, glaciers > 1 km^{2} (0.386 sq mi or 247 acres) and river estuaries.

Mesnac is a commune in the Charente department in southwestern France.

== Population ==
Historical population
Year	Pop.	±% p.a.
1968	282	—
1975	252	−1.59%
1982	256	+0.23%
1990	326	+3.07%
1999	332	+0.20%
2007	346	+0.52%
2012	414	+3.65%
2017	405	−0.44%
2023	404	−0.04%
Source: INSEE

== See also ==
- Communes of the Charente department
