= Javrezac =

- Commune
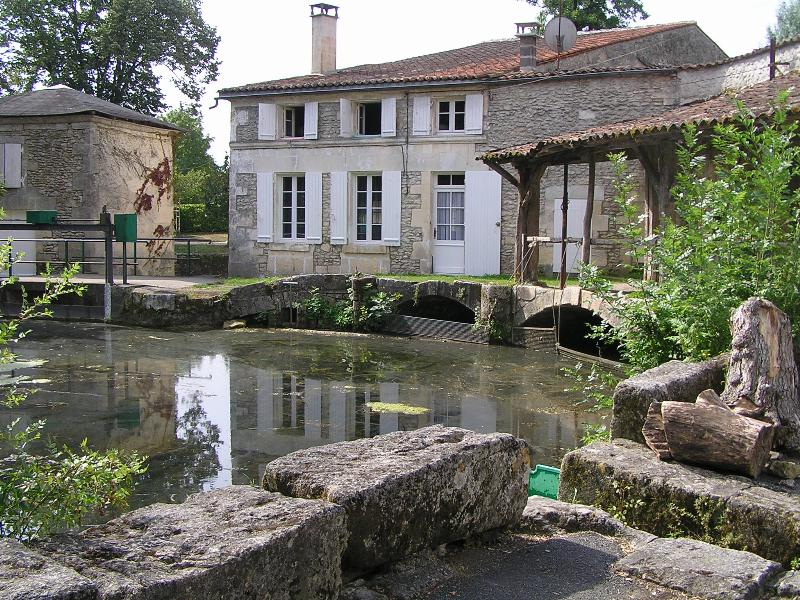
- The Antenne river in Javrezac
- Location of Javrezac
- Location within France Location within Nouvelle-Aquitaine
- Coordinates: 45°42′08″N 0°21′21″W
- Country: France
- Region: Nouvelle-Aquitaine
- Department: Charente
- Arrondissement: Cognac
- Canton: Cognac-2
- Intercommunality: CA Grand Cognac

Government
  - Mayor (2020–2026): Pascale Belle
- Area^{1}: 3.66 km^{2} (1.41 sq mi)
- Elevation: 20 m (66 ft)
- Highest elevation: 69 m (226 ft)
- Lowest elevation: 7 m (23 ft)
- Population (2023): 583
  - Density: 159/km^{2} (413/sq mi)
- Time zone: UTC+01:00 (CET)
  - Summer (DST): UTC+02:00 (CEST)
- INSEE/Postal code: 16169 /16100
- ^{1} French Land Register data, which excludes lakes, ponds, glaciers > 1 km^{2} (0.386 sq mi or 247 acres) and river estuaries.

Javrezac (French pronunciation: [ʒavʁəzak]) is a commune in the Charente department in southwestern France.

Near Cognac, it is located on a limestone plateau dating from the Cretaceous, which consists of soft and chalky limestones. Much of the land is given over to vineyards for producing cognac brandy. Some estates also produce Pineau des Charentes aperitif.

== Population ==
Historical population
Year	Pop.	±% p.a.
1968	705	—
1975	704	−0.02%
1982	678	−0.54%
1990	666	−0.22%
1999	688	+0.36%
2007	646	−0.78%
2012	625	−0.66%
2017	583	−1.38%
2023	583	+0.00%
Source: INSEE

== See also ==
- Communes of the Charente department
