= Bresdon =

- Commune
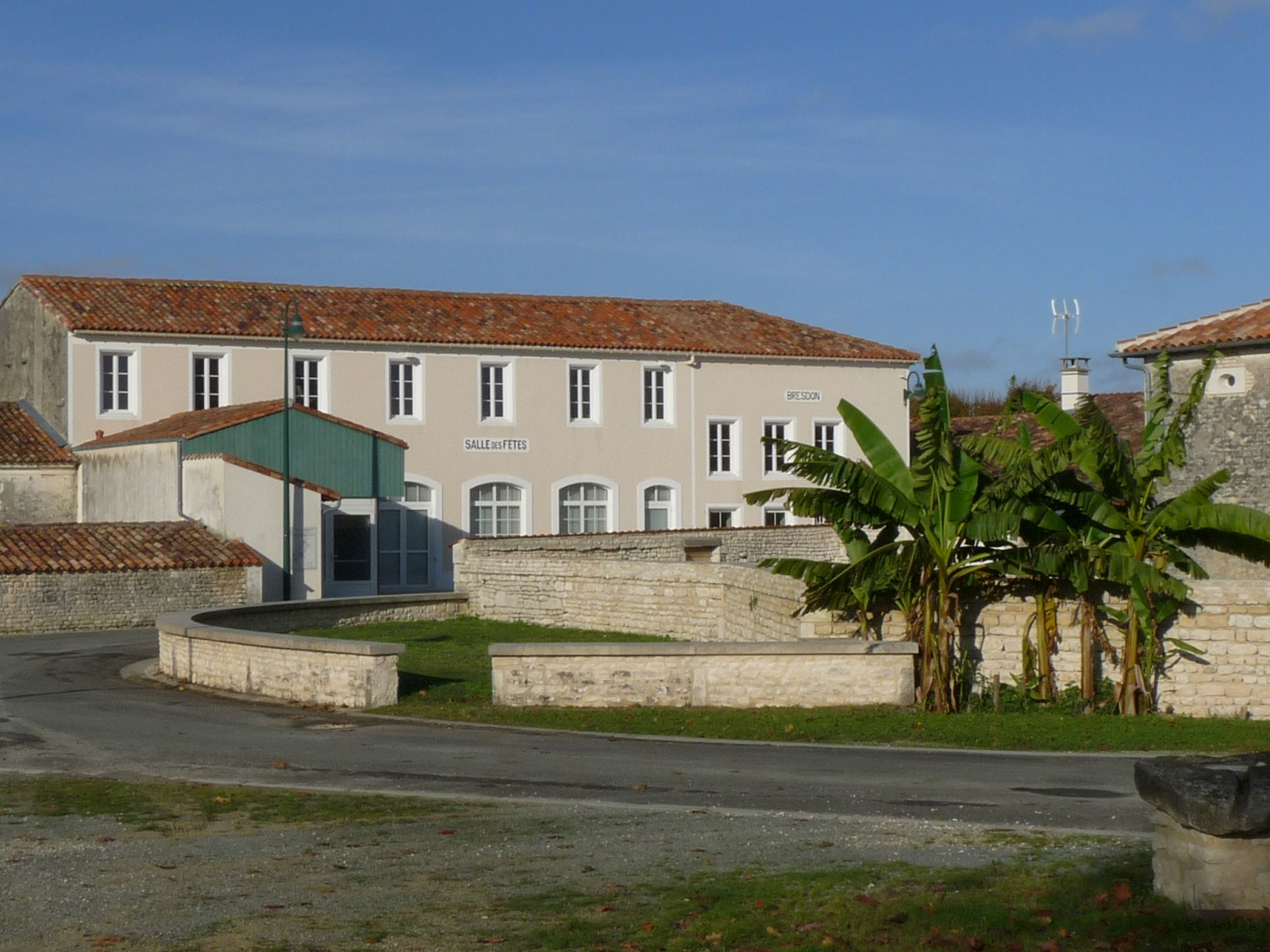
- The town hall in Bresdon
- Location of Bresdon
- Location within France Location within Nouvelle-Aquitaine
- Coordinates: 45°51′52″N 0°08′45″W
- Country: France
- Region: Nouvelle-Aquitaine
- Department: Charente-Maritime
- Arrondissement: Saint-Jean-d'Angély
- Canton: Matha

Government
  - Mayor (2020–2026): Béatrice Geay
- Area^{1}: 16.67 km^{2} (6.44 sq mi)
- Elevation: 81 m (266 ft)
- Highest elevation: 146 m (479 ft)
- Lowest elevation: 78 m (256 ft)
- Population (2023): 231
  - Density: 13.9/km^{2} (35.9/sq mi)
- Time zone: UTC+01:00 (CET)
  - Summer (DST): UTC+02:00 (CEST)
- INSEE/Postal code: 17062 /17490
- ^{1} French Land Register data, which excludes lakes, ponds, glaciers > 1 km^{2} (0.386 sq mi or 247 acres) and river estuaries.

Bresdon (French pronunciation: [bʁɛdɔ̃]) is a commune in the Charente-Maritime department in southwestern France.

== Population ==
Historical population
Year	Pop.	±% p.a.
1968	368	—
1975	391	+0.87%
1982	342	−1.89%
1990	307	−1.34%
1999	279	−1.06%
2007	263	−0.74%
2012	255	−0.62%
2017	223	−2.65%
2023	231	+0.59%
Source: INSEE

== See also ==
- Communes of the Charente-Maritime department
