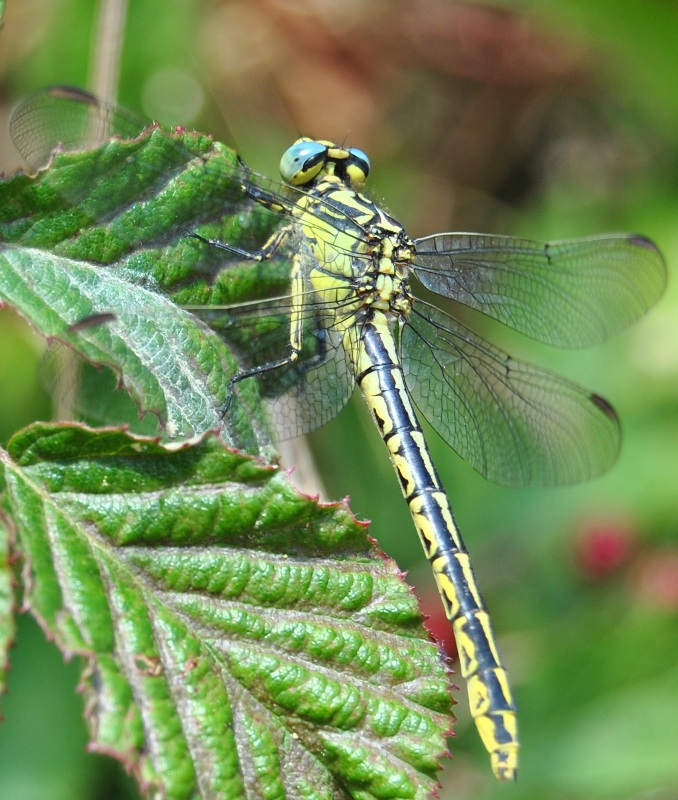

Conservation status
- Near Threatened (IUCN 3.1)

Scientific classification
- Kingdom: Animalia
- Phylum: Arthropoda
- Class: Insecta
- Order: Odonata
- Infraorder: Anisoptera
- Family: Gomphidae
- Genus: Gomphus
- Species: G. graslinii

Binomial name
- Gomphus graslinii Rambur, 1842

Synonyms
- Gomphus graslini Rambur, 1842 [orth. error]

= Gomphus graslinii =

Species of dragonfly

Gomphus graslinii is a species of dragonfly in the family Gomphidae. It is found in France, Portugal, and Spain. Its natural habitat is rivers. It is threatened by habitat loss.
