= Néré =

- Commune
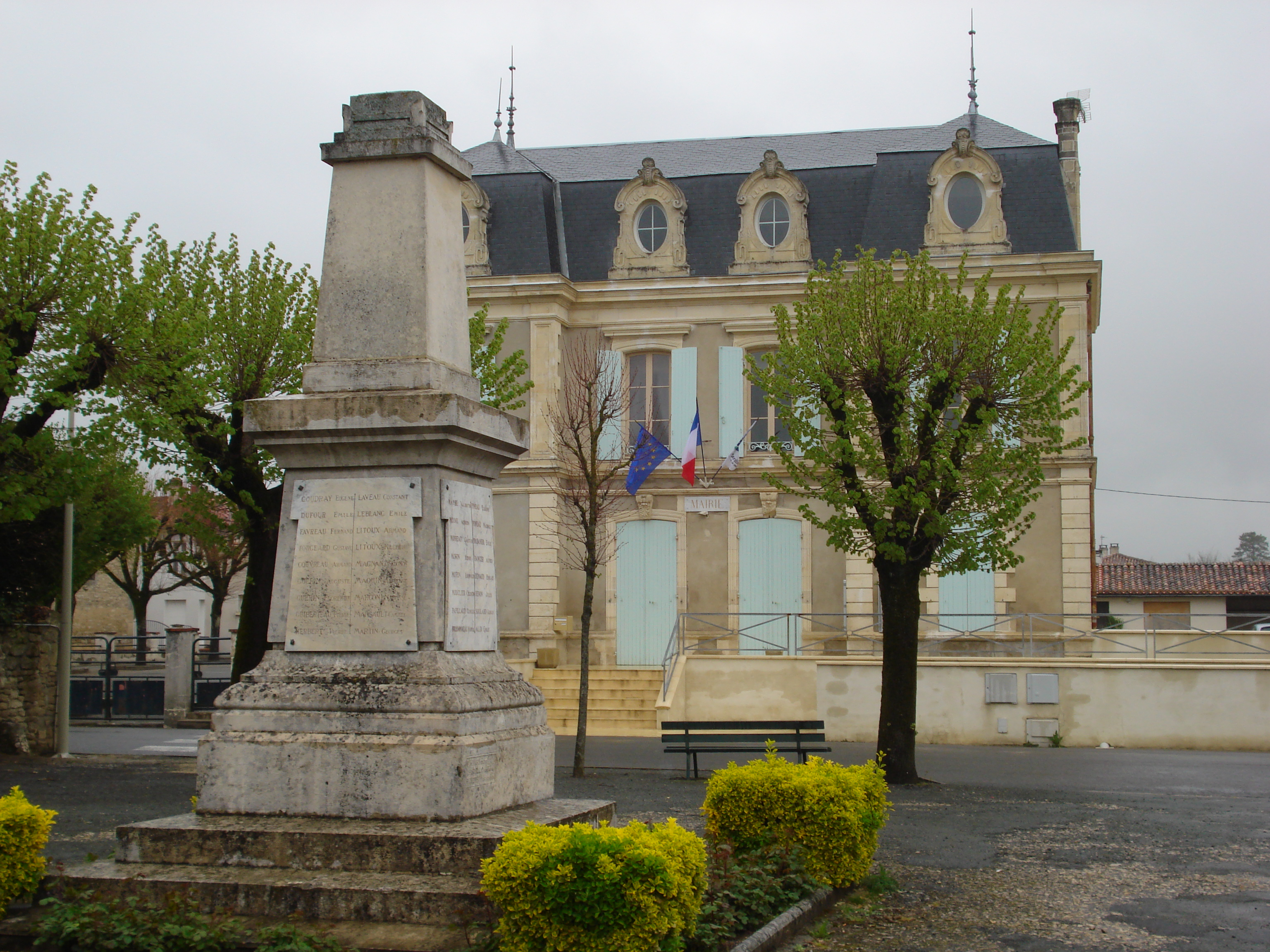
- The town hall in Néré

- Coat of arms
- Location of Néré
- Location within France Location within Nouvelle-Aquitaine
- Coordinates: 45°58′30″N 0°14′04″W
- Country: France
- Region: Nouvelle-Aquitaine
- Department: Charente-Maritime
- Arrondissement: Saint-Jean-d'Angély
- Canton: Matha

Government
  - Mayor (2020–2026): Sylvie Saboureau
- Area^{1}: 29.97 km^{2} (11.57 sq mi)
- Highest elevation: 166 m (545 ft)
- Lowest elevation: 69 m (226 ft)
- Population (2023): 669
  - Density: 22.3/km^{2} (57.8/sq mi)
- Time zone: UTC+01:00 (CET)
  - Summer (DST): UTC+02:00 (CEST)
- INSEE/Postal code: 17257 /17510
- ^{1} French Land Register data, which excludes lakes, ponds, glaciers > 1 km^{2} (0.386 sq mi or 247 acres) and river estuaries.

Néré (French pronunciation: [neʁe]) is a commune in the Charente-Maritime department in southwestern France.

== Population ==
Historical population
Year	Pop.	±% p.a.
1968	961	—
1975	905	−0.85%
1982	849	−0.91%
1990	752	−1.51%
1999	742	−0.15%
2007	734	−0.14%
2012	768	+0.91%
2017	734	−0.90%
2023	669	−1.53%
Source: INSEE

== See also ==
- Communes of the Charente-Maritime department
