= Prignac =

- Commune
- Location of Prignac
- Location within France Location within Nouvelle-Aquitaine
- Coordinates: 45°49′49″N 0°21′20″W
- Country: France
- Region: Nouvelle-Aquitaine
- Department: Charente-Maritime
- Arrondissement: Saint-Jean-d'Angély
- Canton: Matha

Government
  - Mayor (2023–2026): Bruno Mapal
- Area^{1}: 6.77 km^{2} (2.61 sq mi)
- Elevation: 20 m (66 ft)
- Highest elevation: 38 m (125 ft)
- Lowest elevation: 16 m (52 ft)
- Population (2023): 282
  - Density: 41.7/km^{2} (108/sq mi)
- Time zone: UTC+01:00 (CET)
  - Summer (DST): UTC+02:00 (CEST)
- INSEE/Postal code: 17290 /17160
- ^{1} French Land Register data, which excludes lakes, ponds, glaciers > 1 km^{2} (0.386 sq mi or 247 acres) and river estuaries.

Prignac (French pronunciation: [pʁiɲak]) is a commune in the Charente-Maritime department in southwestern France.

== Population ==
Historical population
Year	Pop.	±% p.a.
1968	280	—
1975	276	−0.21%
1982	268	−0.42%
1990	260	−0.38%
1999	256	−0.17%
2007	295	+1.79%
2012	283	−0.83%
2017	297	+0.97%
2023	282	−0.86%
Source: INSEE

== See also ==
- Communes of the Charente-Maritime department
