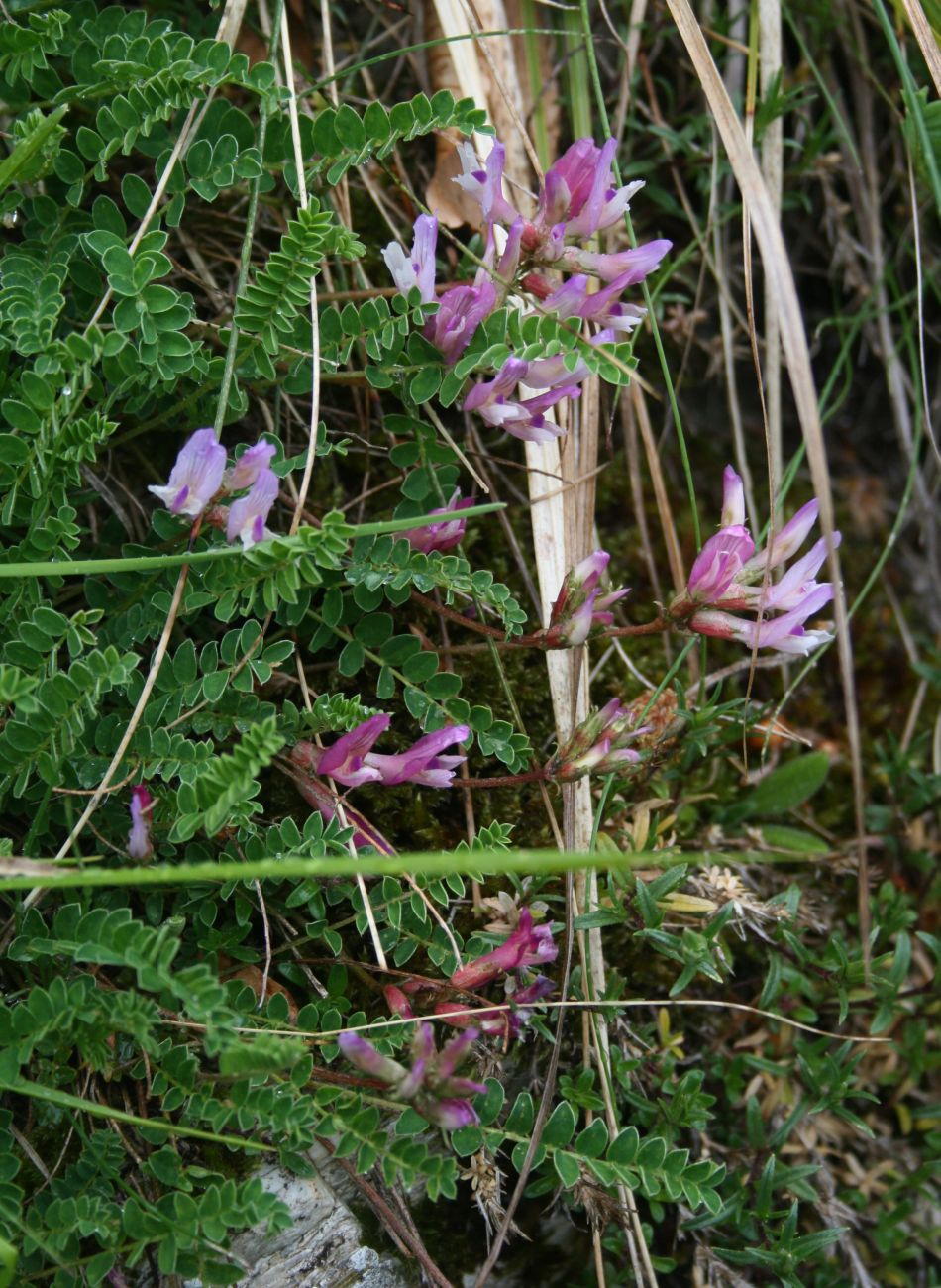

Scientific classification
- Kingdom: Plantae
- Clade: Tracheophytes
- Clade: Angiosperms
- Clade: Eudicots
- Clade: Rosids
- Order: Fabales
- Family: Fabaceae
- Subfamily: Faboideae
- Genus: Astragalus
- Species: A. monspessulanus

Binomial name
- Astragalus monspessulanus L. Species Plantarum 2:761. 1753

Subspecies
- Astragalus monspessulanus subsp. illyricus (Bernh.) Chater; Astragalus monspessulanus subsp. monspessulanus L. Astragalus monspessulanus subsp. teresianus (Sennen & Elias)Amich

= Astragalus monspessulanus =

Species of legume

Astragalus monspessulanus is a species of milkvetch known by the common name Montpellier milkvetch. It is native to Southern and Eastern Europe, including France, Switzerland, and the Balkans, as well as northwest Africa.

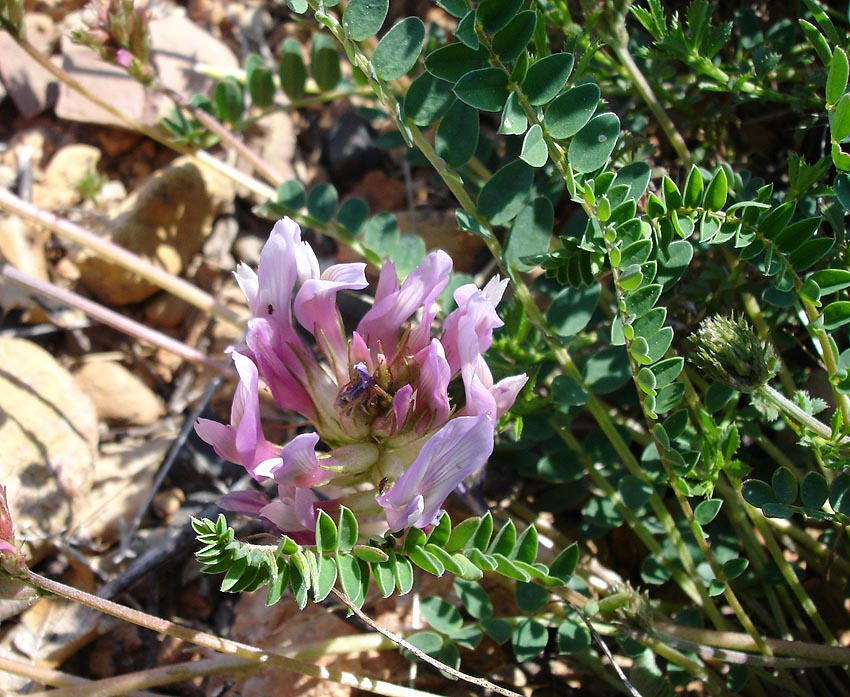

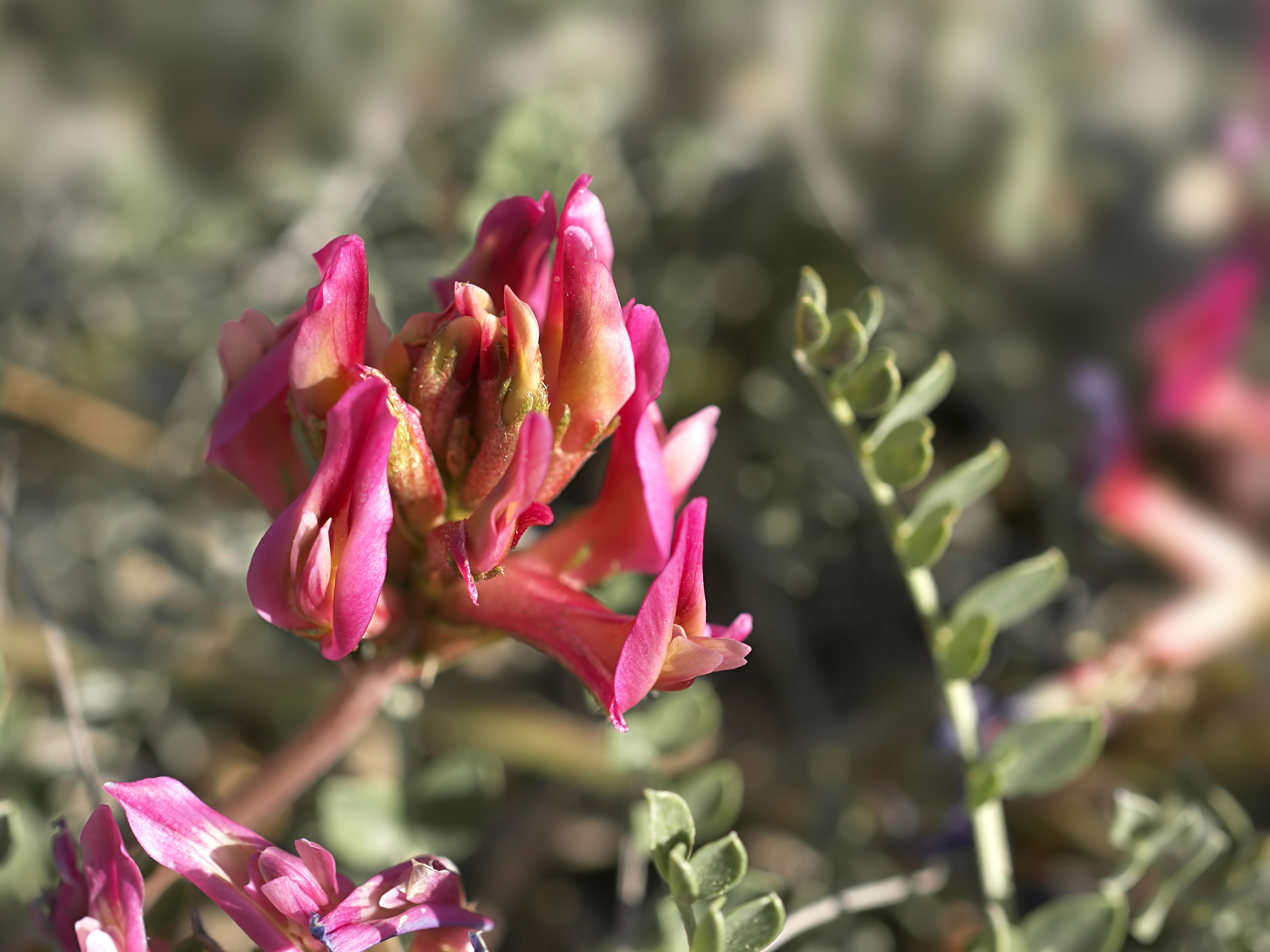
