= Fontaine-Chalendray =

- Commune
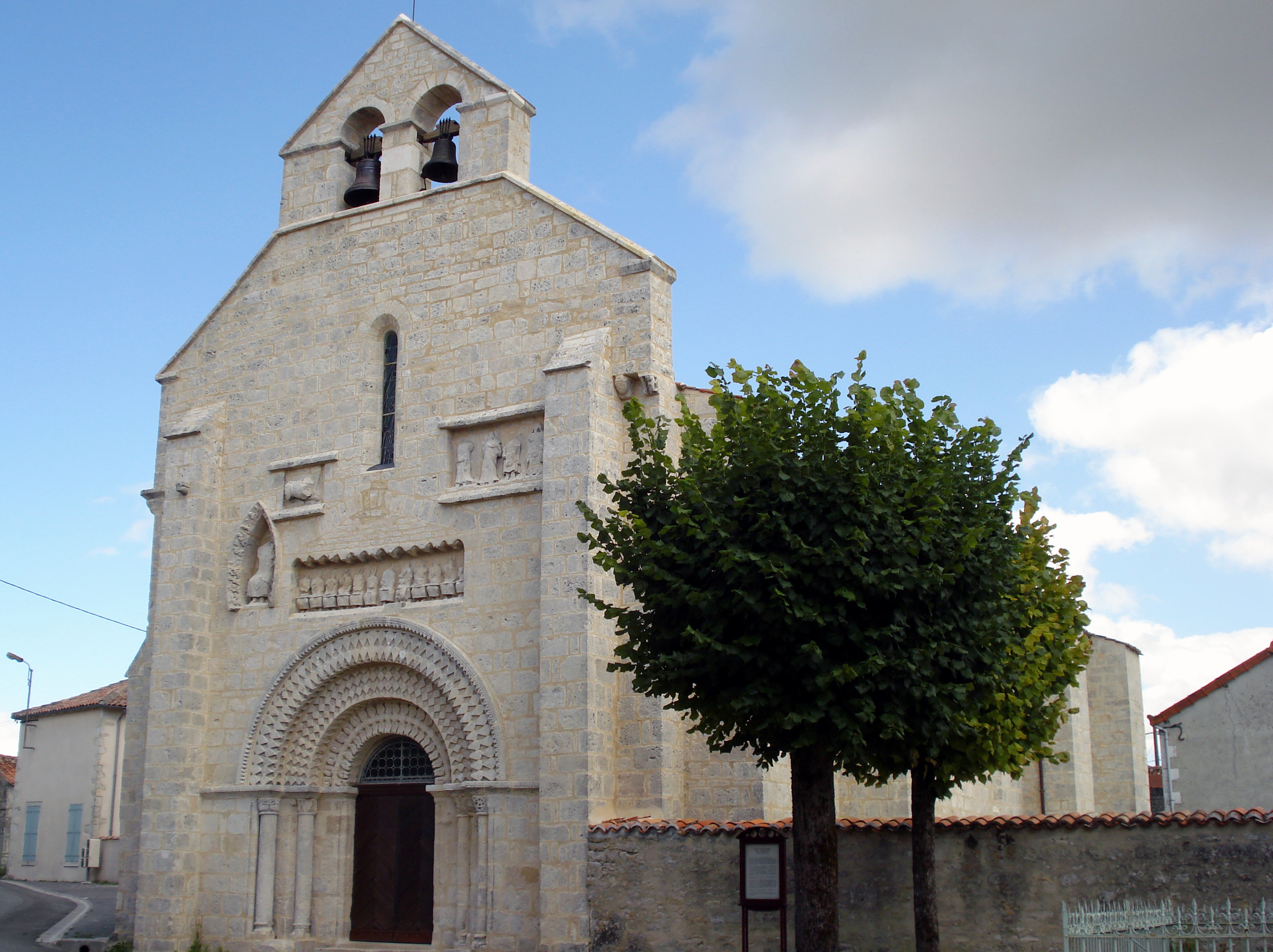
- The church in Fontaine-Chalendray

- Coat of arms
- Location of Fontaine-Chalendray
- Location within France Location within Nouvelle-Aquitaine
- Coordinates: 45°56′55″N 0°10′52″W
- Country: France
- Region: Nouvelle-Aquitaine
- Department: Charente-Maritime
- Arrondissement: Saint-Jean-d'Angély
- Canton: Matha
- Intercommunality: Vals de Saintonge

Government
  - Mayor (2020–2026): Didier Borel
- Area^{1}: 18.86 km^{2} (7.28 sq mi)
- Highest elevation: 154 m (505 ft)
- Lowest elevation: 69 m (226 ft)
- Population (2023): 237
  - Density: 12.6/km^{2} (32.5/sq mi)
- Time zone: UTC+01:00 (CET)
  - Summer (DST): UTC+02:00 (CEST)
- INSEE/Postal code: 17162 /17510
- ^{1} French Land Register data, which excludes lakes, ponds, glaciers > 1 km^{2} (0.386 sq mi or 247 acres) and river estuaries.

Fontaine-Chalendray (French pronunciation: [fɔ̃tɛn ʃalɑ̃dʁɛ]) is a commune in the Charente-Maritime department in southwestern France.

== Population ==
Historical population
| Year | Pop. | ±% p.a. |
|---|---|---|
| 1968 | 432 | — |
| 1975 | 374 | −2.04% |
| 1982 | 336 | −1.52% |
| 1990 | 270 | −2.70% |
| 1999 | 284 | +0.56% |
| 2007 | 241 | −2.03% |
| 2012 | 219 | −1.90% |
| 2017 | 201 | −1.70% |
| 2023 | 237 | +2.78% |
Source: INSEE

== See also ==
- Communes of the Charente-Maritime department
