= Rives-de-Boutonne =

- Commune
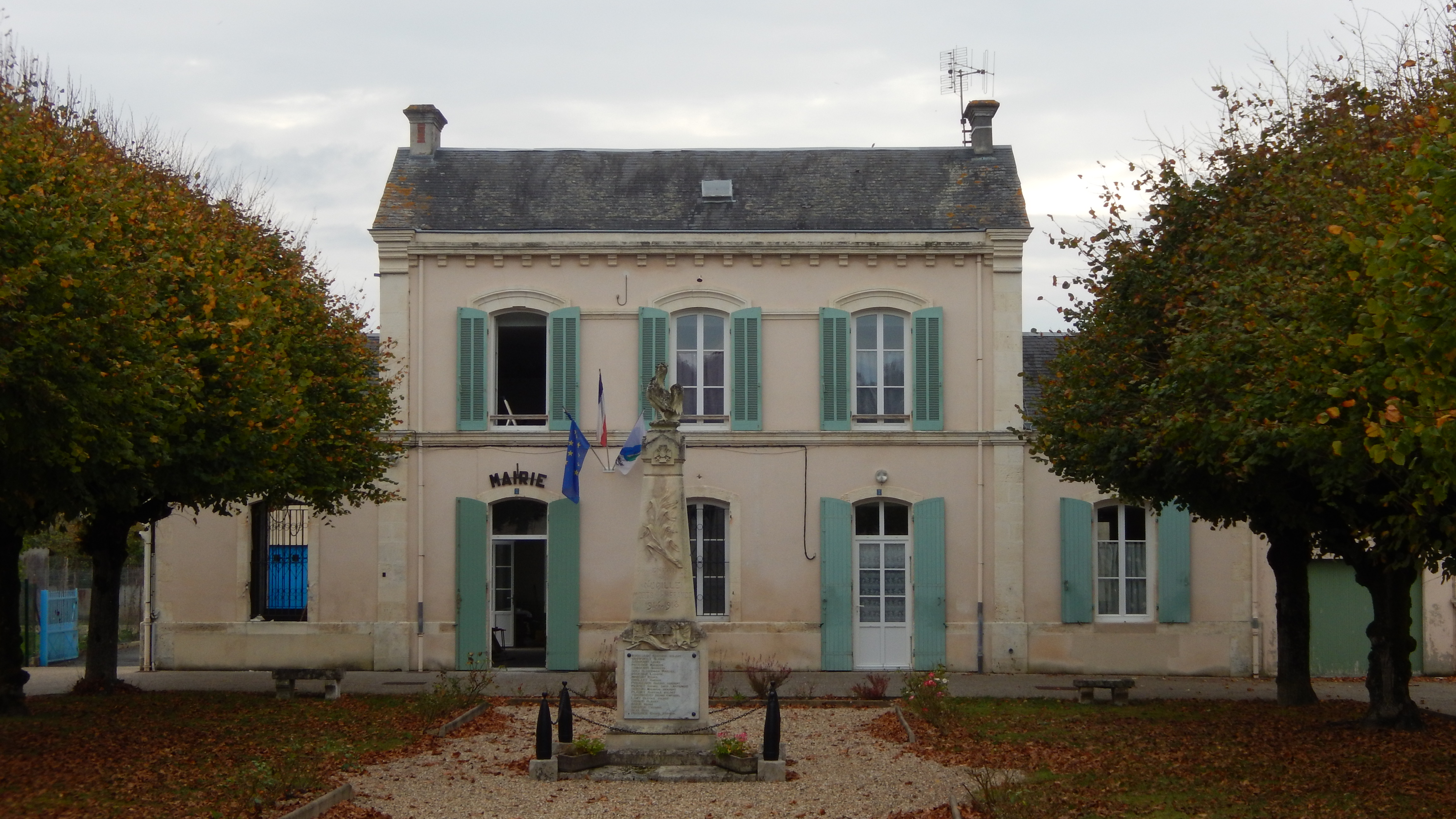
- The town hall in Nuaillé-sur-Boutonne
- Location of Rives-de-Boutonne
- Location within France Location within Nouvelle-Aquitaine
- Coordinates: 46°00′52″N 0°26′00″W
- Country: France
- Region: Nouvelle-Aquitaine
- Department: Charente-Maritime
- Arrondissement: Saint-Jean-d'Angély
- Canton: Matha
- Intercommunality: Vals de Saintonge Communauté
- Area^{1}: 21.17 km^{2} (8.17 sq mi)
- Highest elevation: 82 m (269 ft)
- Lowest elevation: 21 m (69 ft)
- Population (2023): 419
  - Density: 19.8/km^{2} (51.3/sq mi)
- Time zone: UTC+01:00 (CET)
  - Summer (DST): UTC+02:00 (CEST)
- INSEE/Postal code: 17268 /17470
- ^{1} French Land Register data, which excludes lakes, ponds, glaciers > 1 km^{2} (0.386 sq mi or 247 acres) and river estuaries.

Rives-de-Boutonne (French pronunciation: [ʁiv də butɔn], lit. 'Banks of Boutonne') is a commune in the Charente-Maritime department in southwestern France. It was formed on 1 January 2025, with the merger of Nuaillé-sur-Boutonne and Saint-Georges-de-Longuepierre.

== See also ==
- Communes of the Charente-Maritime department
