= Siegfried Line campaign =

Action in European theatre of WWII

- Part of the Western Allied invasion of Germany in World War II
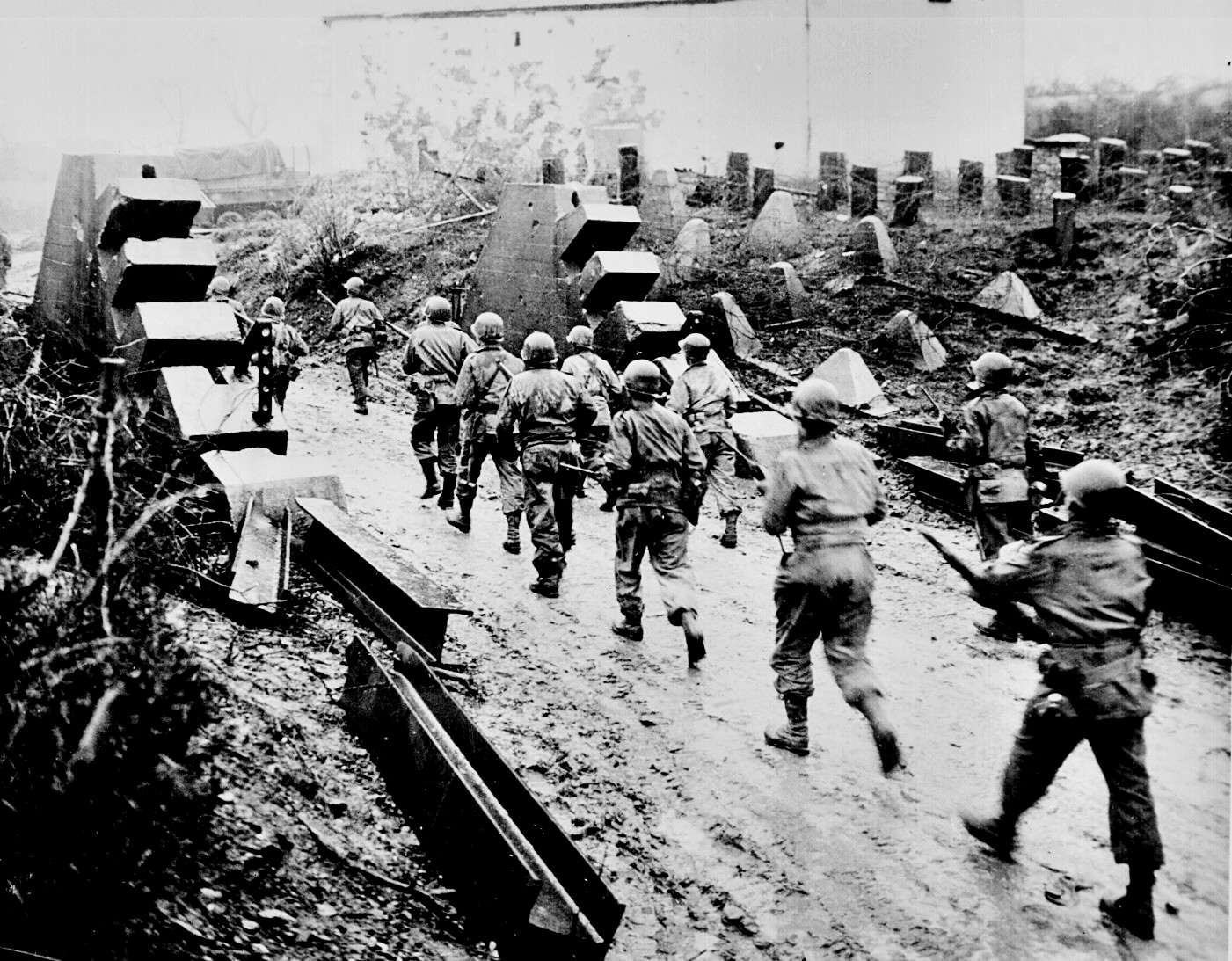
- U.S. Army troops cross the Siegfried Line.
Date	28 August – 16 December 1944
Location	Along and around the Siegfried Line (Northern France, Belgium, Luxembourg, the Netherlands, and the Rhine river)
Result	Allied victory

Belligerents
Allies; United States; United Kingdom; France; Canada; Poland; Belgium; Czechoslovakia; Netherlands; Luxembourg; Norway	Germany

Commanders and leaders
(United States) Dwight D. Eisenhower (SHAEF); (United Kingdom) Bernard Montgomery (21st Army Group); (United States) Omar Bradley (12th Army Group)	(Nazi Germany) Gerd von Rundstedt (Oberbefehlshaber West); (Nazi Germany) Walter Model (Army Group B)

Strength
3,250,000 (80 divisions); 7,700 tanks; 13,000 aircraft; 43,110 artillery pieces and mortars; 800,000 vehicles	1,699,000 (74 divisions); 3,200 tanks; 3,110 aircraft; 8,000 artillery pieces and mortars; 300,000 vehicles

Casualties and losses
(United States) : 240,082 casualties; (50,410 killed; 172,450 wounded; 24,374 captured or missing); (15 September 1944 – 21 March 1945); (United Kingdom) : 32,366; (France) : 15,390–17,390; (Canada) : 15,000; Total: 272,448+ casualties	(Nazi Germany) : 40,000–70,000+ killed (Note: Germans killed in action could reach up to well over 70,000 from September 1944 to March 1945 according to the German military historian Rudiger Overmans, who claims that the total figure of German KIA on the Western Front until 31 December 1944 is around 339,957. He has written one of the most detailed and comprehensive works on German casualties in World War II.); 80,000 wounded; 280,000+ captured; Total: 400,000+ casualties

The Siegfried Line campaign was a phase in the Western European campaign of World War II, which involved engagements near the German defensive Siegfried Line.

This campaign spanned from the end of Operation Overlord and the push across northern France, which ended on 15 September 1944, and concluded with the opening of the German Ardennes counteroffensive, better known as the Battle of the Bulge.

== Background ==
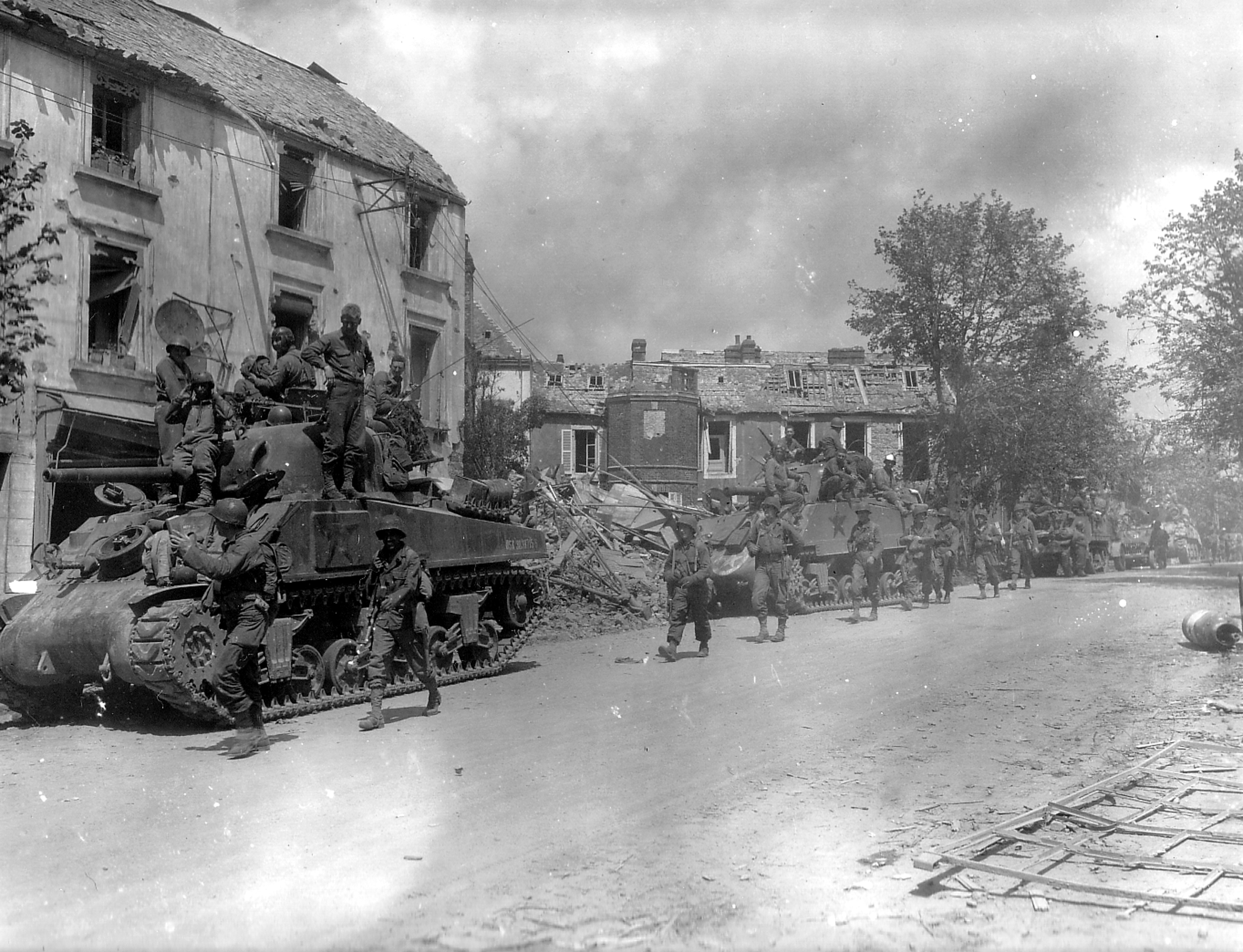
M4 and M4A3 Sherman tanks and infantrymen of the U.S. 4th Armored Division advancing through Coutances.

German forces had been routed during the Allied break-out from Normandy. The Allies advanced rapidly against an enemy that put up little resistance. But after the liberation of Paris in late August 1944, the Allies paused to re-group and organise before continuing their advance from Paris to the River Rhine. The pause allowed the Germans to solidify their lines—something they had been unable to do west of Paris.

By the middle of September 1944, the three Western Allied army groups; the Anglo-Canadian 21st Army Group (Field Marshal Sir Bernard Montgomery) in the north, the United States 12th Army Group (Lieutenant General Omar Bradley) in the center, and the Franco-American 6th Army Group (Lieutenant General Jacob L. Devers) in the south, formed a broad front under the Supreme Allied Commander, General Dwight D. Eisenhower and his headquarters SHAEF (Supreme Headquarters Allied Expeditionary Force).

While Montgomery and Bradley each favored relatively direct thrusts into Germany (with Montgomery and Bradley each offering to be the spearhead of such an assault), General Eisenhower disagreed. Instead, he chose a "broad-front" strategy, which allowed the Allies to gain ground from the beaten Germans in all sectors, allowed the advancing Allied forces to support each other.

The rapid advance through France had caused considerable logistical strain, made worse by the lack of any major port other than the relatively distant Cherbourg in western France. Although Antwerp was seen as the key to solving the Allied logistics problems, its port was not open to Allied shipping until the Scheldt estuary was clear of German forces. As the campaign progressed, all the belligerents, Allied as well as German, felt the effects of the lack of suitable replacements for front-line troops.

There were two major defensive obstacles to the Allies. The first was the natural barriers made by the rivers of eastern France. The second was the Siegfried Line, which fell under the command, along with all Wehrmacht forces in the west, of Generalfeldmarschall Gerd von Rundstedt.

=== Logistics and supply ===
Although the breakout from Normandy had taken longer than planned, the advances until September had far exceeded expectations. Bradley, for example, by September had four more divisions than planned and all of his forces were 150 miles (240 km) ahead of their expected position. One effect was that insufficient supplies could be delivered to the various fronts to maintain the advance: demand had exceeded the expected needs.

Mulberry 'A' off Omaha Beach was critical in the early days for Allied supplies.

Much war materiel still had to be brought ashore across the invasion beaches and through the one remaining Mulberry harbour (the other had been destroyed in an English Channel storm). Although small harbours, such as Isigny, Port-en-Bessin, and Courcelles, were being used, the major forward ports such as Calais, Boulogne, Dunkirk and Le Havre either remained in German hands as "fortresses" or had been systematically destroyed. The availability of Cherbourg had been valuable until the breakout, but then the shortage of transport to carry supplies to the rapidly advancing armies became the limiting factor.

Although fuel was successfully pumped from Britain to Normandy via the Pluto pipeline, this still had to reach the fronts, which were advancing faster than the pipelines could be extended. The railways had been largely destroyed by Allied attacks and would take much effort to repair, so fleets of trucks were needed in the interim. In an attempt to address this acute shortage of transport, three newly arrived U.S. infantry divisions—the 26th, 95th, and 104th—were stripped of their trucks in order to haul supplies. Advancing divisions of the U.S. 12th Army Group left all their heavy artillery and half their medium artillery west of the Seine, freeing their trucks to move supplies for other units. Four British truck companies were loaned to the Americans. Another 1,500 British trucks were found to have critical engine faults and were unusable, limiting assistance from that quarter. The Red Ball Express was an attempt to expedite deliveries by truck but capacity was inadequate for the circumstances.

The 6th Army Group advancing from southern France were supplied adequately from Toulon and Marseille because it had captured ports intact and the local railway system was less damaged. This source supplied about 25% of the Allied needs.

At this time the main Allied supply lines still ran back to Normandy, presenting serious logistical problems. The solution was to open the port of Antwerp. This major port had been captured at 90% intact on 4 September, but the occupation of Antwerp was not enough as the 21st Army Group failed to gain sea access by clearing the Scheldt estuary. So the port could not be used until 29 November after a protracted campaign by the Canadian First Army; initially the estuary was weakly held, but the German 15th Army was allowed to dig in there.

The delay in securing this area has been blamed on General Eisenhower as the 21st Army Group commander, Field Marshal Montgomery favored Operation Market-Garden and opening the French Channel ports over clearing the approaches to the port of Antwerp in the Battle of the Scheldt. However, even if the Scheldt Estuary had been secured immediately at the start of September, the port of Antwerp would not solve the supply crisis in that month, for the approaches had been mined by the Germans two months earlier, and when finally taken it took one month to clear it.

=== Manpower ===
The German armies had lost large numbers of troops in Normandy and the subsequent pursuit. To counteract this, about 20,000 Luftwaffe personnel were reallocated to the German Army, invalided troops were redrafted into the front line and Volkssturm units were formed using barely trained civilians.

British manpower resources were limited after five years of war and through worldwide commitments. Replacements were no longer adequate to cover losses and some formations were disbanded to maintain the strength of others. The Canadians were also short of manpower, due to a reluctance to require conscripts to serve outside Canada or Canadian waters. This had arisen from Conscription Crisis of 1917 during World War I; to avoid similar problems in World War II, the National Resources Mobilization Act of 1940 prohibited sending conscripts overseas. However, this provision of the Act was later removed, leading to the Conscription Crisis of 1944. (Note: The legal embargo on compulsory overseas service was the subject of a national plebiscite on 27 April 1942: 83% of the English-speaking population supported the removal of the restriction, but in Francophone Quebec, 72% were against.)

American losses now called on replacements direct from the United States. They were often inexperienced and not used to the harsh conditions of the latter part of the campaign. There were also complaints about the poor quality of troops released into the infantry from less-stressed parts of the U.S. Army. At one point, after the Battle of the Bulge had highlighted the shortage of infantrymen, the Army relaxed its embargo on the use of black soldiers in combat formations. Black volunteers performed well throughout the phase and prompted a permanent change in military policy.

== Campaign ==
=== Northern Group of Armies (21st Army Group) ===
==== Channel ports ====
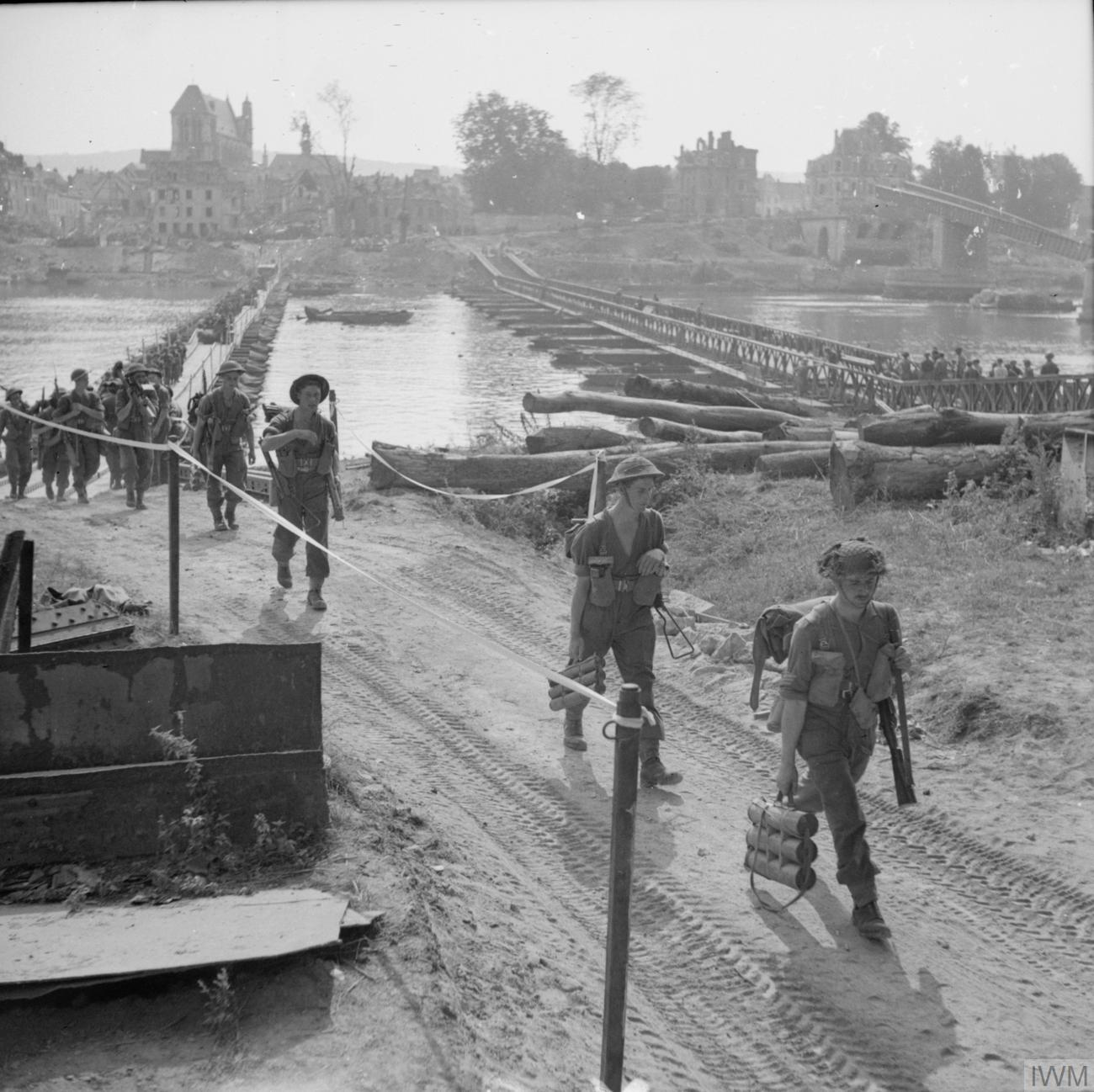
British infantry of the 1st Battalion, Hampshire Regiment crossing the Seine at Vernon, 28 August 1944.

The Channel ports were urgently needed to maintain the Allied armies. By the time that Brussels was liberated, it had become difficult to supply the 21st Army Group adequately. Indeed, one corps—VIII Corps—was withdrawn from active service to free its transport for general use. The Canadian First Army was tasked with liberating the ports during its advance along the French coast. The ports involved were Le Havre, Dieppe, Boulogne, Calais, and Dunkirk in France, as well as Ostend in Belgium. Adolf Hitler had appreciated their strategic value. He issued a Führer Order declaring them to be "fortresses" that must receive adequate materiel for a siege and be held to the last man.

Dieppe was evacuated by the Germans before Hitler's order had been received and, consequently, the Canadians took it with little trouble and with the port installations largely intact. Ostend had been omitted from the Führer Order and was also undefended, although demolitions delayed its use. The other ports were defended to varying degrees, however, and they required substantial work to bring them into use, except for Dunkirk which was sealed off to the rear of the Allied advance.

==== Market Garden ====
The first operation of the Rhineland campaign, Market Garden, was commanded by Montgomery and was to secure a bridgehead over the Rhine in the north, at Arnhem, which would outflank the Siegfried Line.

Market Garden had two distinct parts. Market was to be the largest airborne operation in history, dropping three and a half divisions of American, British, and Polish paratroopers to capture key bridges and prevent their demolition by the Germans. Garden was a ground attack by the British Second Army across the bridges. It was assumed that the German forces would still be recovering from the previous campaign and opposition would not be very stiff for either operation.

If successful, the Allies would have a direct route into Germany that bypassed the main German defenses and also seize territory from which the Germans launched V-1s and V-2s against London, Antwerp and elsewhere.

General Eisenhower approved Market Garden. On 10 September he gave supply priority to the 21st Army Group and decided to divert the U.S. First Army to the north of the Ardennes to stage limited attacks to draw German defenders south, away from the target sites.

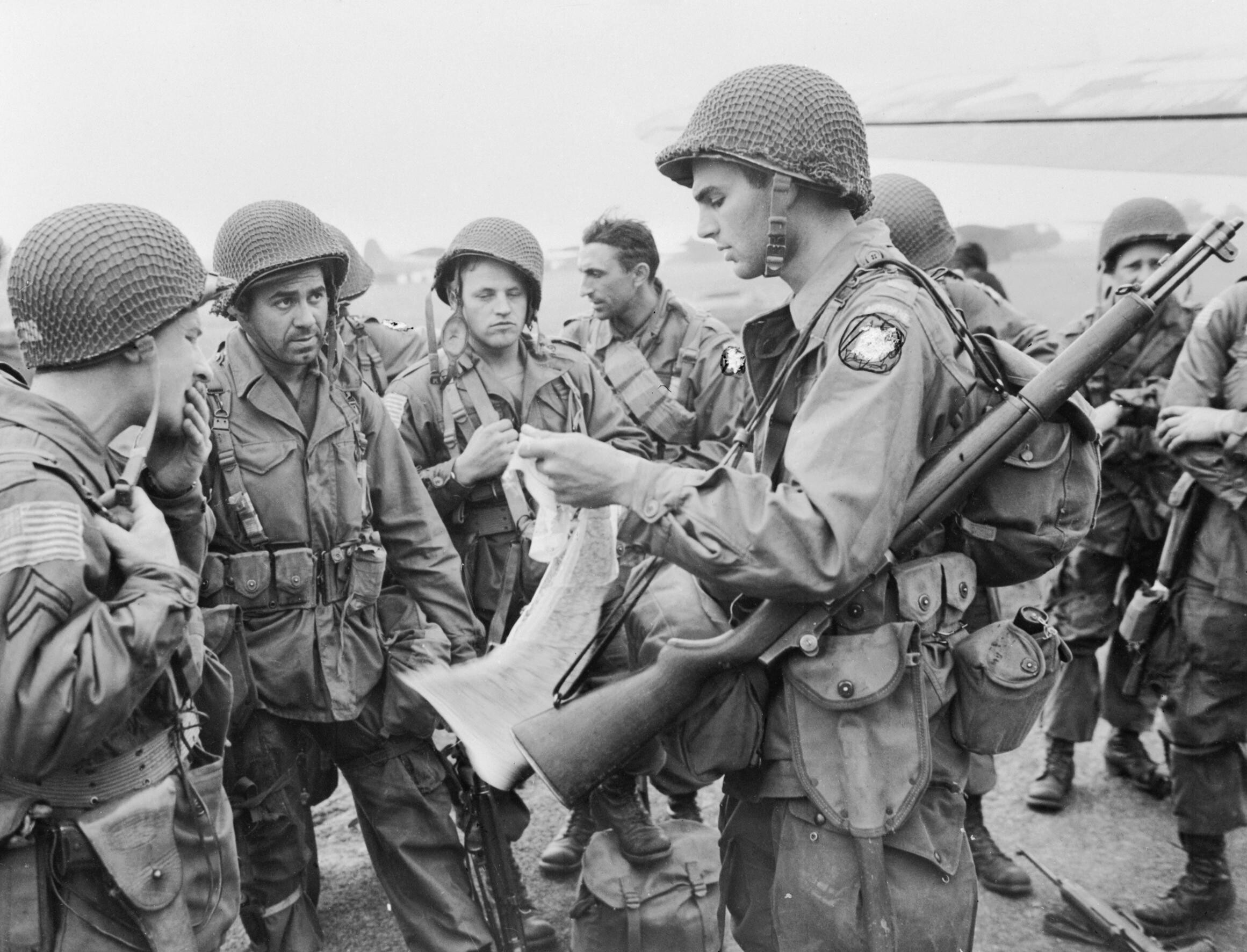
American paratroopers receive a final briefing from their commanding officer before emplaning, 17 September 1944

The operation was launched on 17 September. At first, it went well. The U.S. 101st and 82nd Airborne Divisions took their objectives at Eindhoven, Veghel and Nijmegen. However, the 82nd failed to capture its main objectives, the Nijmegen bridges, and instead its commander focused on the Groesbeek Heights. Although their landings outside Arnhem were on target, the British 1st Airborne Division landing zones were some distance from Arnhem bridge and only on the north side of the river. Problems arose when the British 1st Airborne Division lost vital equipment—jeeps and heavy anti-tank guns—when gliders crashed. There had also been a severe underestimation of German strength in the area. To make matters worse, poor weather prevented aerial reinforcements and drastically reduced resupply. German resistance to the forces driving to Arnhem was highly effective, and a copy of the Allied battle plan had been captured.

In the end, Market Garden was unsuccessful. Arnhem bridge was not held and the British paratroops suffered tremendous casualties—approximately 77% by 25 September. The failure of the 82nd to capture the Nijmegen bridges in a coup de main meant that the British ground forces meant to relieve the 1st Airborne Division at Arnhem were delayed for 36 hours, as the Guards Armoured Division, despite arriving in Nijmegen ahead of schedule, was forced to pour its forces to capture the bridges, instead of simply moving across, as had been planned. The allies managed to hold on to the salient in early October by repelling a German counter offensive.

==== Battle of the Scheldt ====
The logistics situation was becoming critical, so opening the Port of Antwerp was now a high priority. On 12 September 1944, the Canadian First Army was given the task of clearing the Scheldt of German forces. The 1st Army comprised the II Canadian Corps, which included the Polish 1st Armoured Division, the British 49th and 52nd Divisions and the British I Corps.

The task involved four main operations: The first was to clear the area north of Antwerp and secure access to South Beveland. The second was to clear the Breskens pocket north of the Leopold Canal (Operation Switchback). The third—Operation Vitality—was the capture of South Beveland. The final phase was the capture of Walcheren Island, which had been fortified into a powerful German stronghold.

On 21 September 1944, the advance began. The 4th Canadian Armoured Division, moving north toward the south shore of the Scheldt around the Dutch town of Breskens, were the first Allied troops to face the formidable obstacle of the double line of the Leopold and Dérivation de la Lys Canals. The canals were crossed and a bridgehead established, but fierce counter-attacks by the Germans forced them to withdraw with heavy casualties. The 1st Polish Armoured Division had greater success, moving northeast to the coast, occupying Terneuzen and clearing the south bank of the Scheldt eastward to Antwerp. It was by then clear, however, that any further advances would be at tremendous cost.

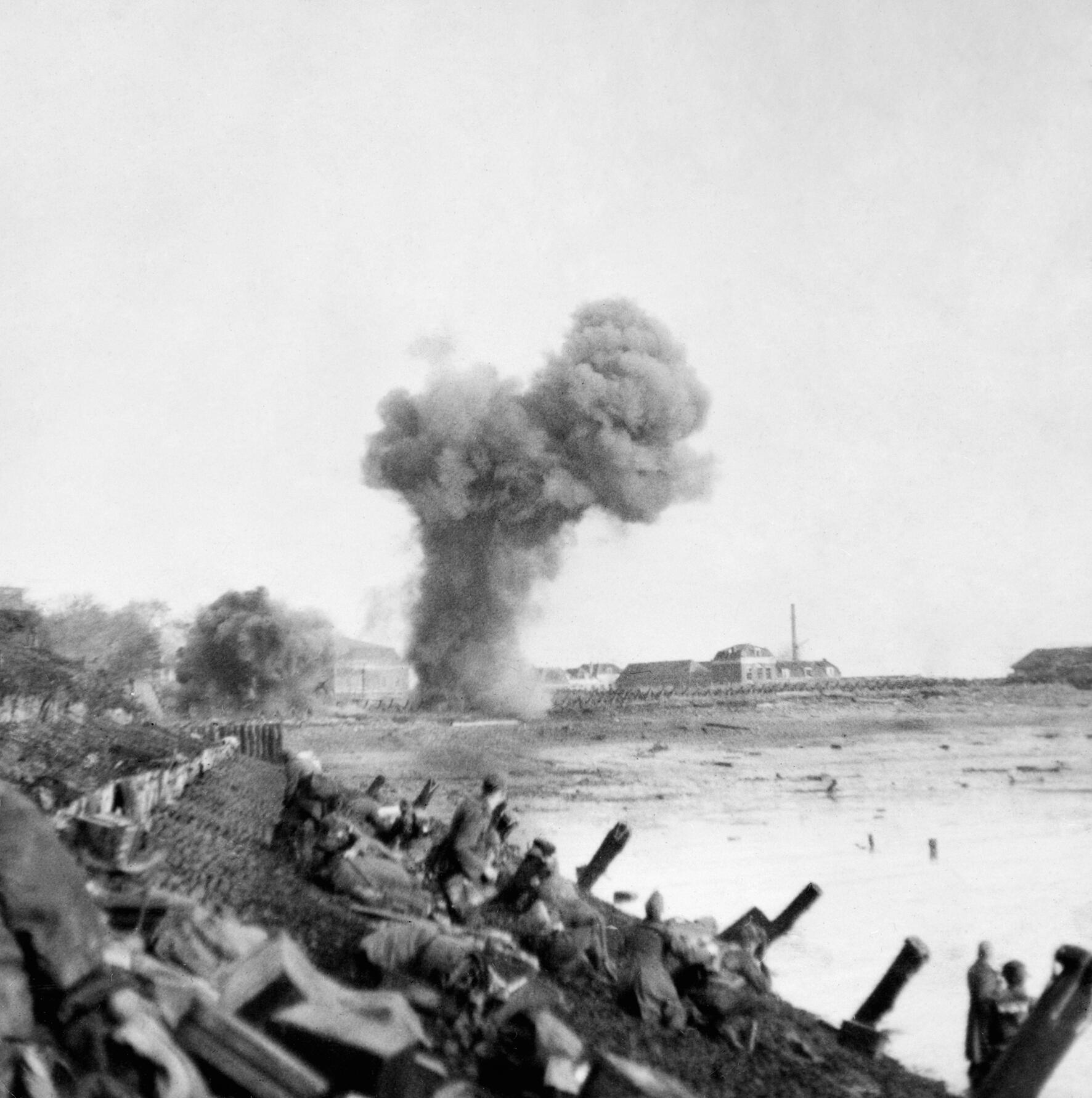
British assault troops advancing near Flushing with shells bursting ahead during the Scheldt operation.

The 2nd Canadian Infantry Division began its advance north from Antwerp on 2 October. Heavy casualties ensued, including the almost total destruction of the 5th Canadian Infantry Brigade's Black Watch Battalion on 13 October. However, on 16 October Woensdrecht was taken, following an immense artillery barrage which forced the Germans back. This cut South Beveland and Walcheren off from the mainland and achieved the objective of the first operation.

Montgomery issued a directive that made the opening of the Scheldt estuary the top priority. To the east, the British Second Army attacked westward to clear the Netherlands south of the Meuse (Maas). This helped secure the Scheldt region from counter-attack.

In Operation Switchback, the 3rd Canadian Infantry Division mounted a two-pronged attack, with the 7th Canadian Infantry Brigade crossing the Leopold Canal and the 9th Canadian Infantry Brigade launching an amphibious assault from the coastal side of the pocket. Despite fierce resistance from the Germans, the 10th Canadian Infantry Brigade crossed the Leopold Canal and the 8th Canadian Infantry Brigade moved southwards, opening a supply route into the pocket.

Operation Vitality—the third major phase of the Battle of the Scheldt—began on 24 October. The 2nd Canadian Infantry Division began its advance toward South Beveland, but was slowed by mines, mud and strong enemy defences. The British 52nd Division made an amphibious attack to get in behind the Germans' Beveland Canal defensive positions. Thus, this formidable defence was outflanked, and the 6th Canadian Infantry Brigade began a frontal attack in assault boats. The engineers were able to bridge the canal on the main road. With the canal line gone, the German defence crumbled and South Beveland was cleared. The third phase of the Battle of the Scheldt was now complete.

The final phase, Operation Infatuate was the attack on the heavily fortified island of Walcheren at the mouth of the West Scheldt. The island's dykes were breached by attacks from RAF Bomber Command on 3, 7, and 11 October. This flooded the central part of the island, forcing the German defenders onto the high ground and allowing the use of amphibious vehicles. Units of the 2nd Canadian Infantry Division attacked the causeway on 31 October, and after a grim struggle, established a precarious foothold. They were relieved by a battalion of the British 52nd Division. In conjunction with the waterborne attacks, the 52nd continued the advance.

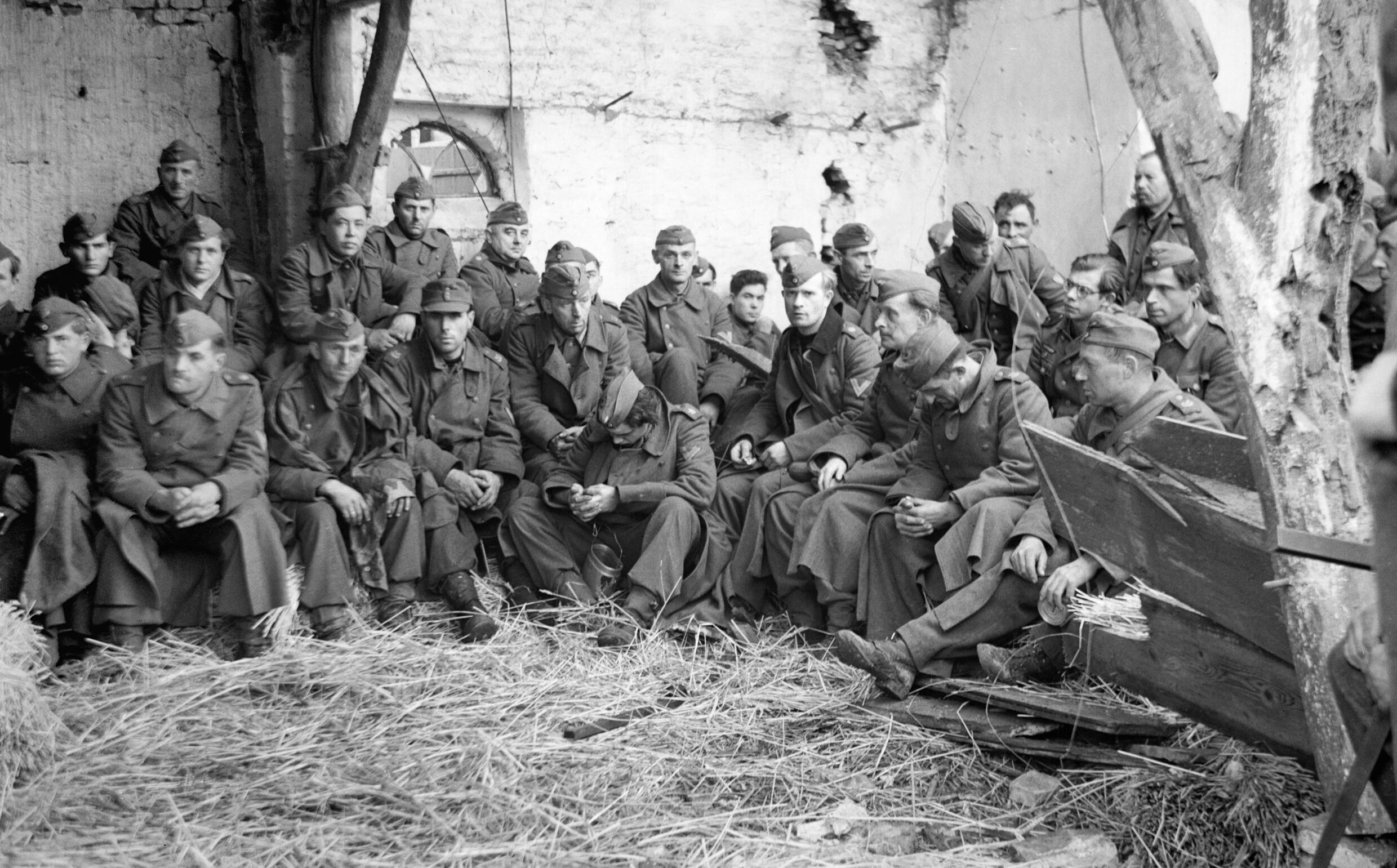
German prisoners on Walcheren – around 40,000 were taken after the Operation Infatuate had terminated

The amphibious landings began on 1 November with units of the British 155th Infantry Brigade landing on a beach in the south-eastern area of Vlissingen. During the next few days, they engaged in heavy street fighting against the German defenders. Also on 1 November, after a heavy naval bombardment by the British Royal Navy, troops of 4th Commando Brigade, (with units of 10th Inter Allied Commando, consisting mainly of Belgian and Norwegian troops), supported by specialised armoured vehicles of the British 79th Armoured Division were landed on both sides of the gap in the sea dyke. Heavy fighting ensued. A smaller force moved south-eastward, toward Vlissingen, while the main force went northeast to clear the northern half of Walcheren to link up with the Canadians who had established a bridgehead on the eastern part of the island. Fierce resistance was again offered by German troops defending the area, and fighting continued until 7 November. However, the action ended on 8 November after a force of amphibious vehicles entered Middelburg, the capital of Walcheren.

Meanwhile, Operation Pheasant was launched in on 20 October which was intended as a major operation to clear German troops from the Province of North Brabant in conjunction with the battle of the Scheldt. The offensive after some resistance liberated most of region; the cities of Tilburg, 's-Hertogenbosch, Willemstad and Roosendaal were liberated by British forces. Bergen Op Zoom was taken by the Canadians and the Polish 1st Armoured Division led by General Maczek liberated the city of Breda. As a result, the German positions which had defended the region along its canals and rivers had been broken. The operation was also a success in that civilian casualties were relatively light.

Meanwhile, the 4th Canadian Armoured Division had pushed eastwards past Bergen-op-Zoom to Sint Philipsland where it sank several German vessels in Zijpe harbour. With the approaches to Antwerp free, the fourth phase of the Battle of the Scheldt was complete; on 28 November, the first convoy entered the port.

=== Central Group of Armies (12th Army Group) ===
==== Northern France and Belgium ====
The US First Army advanced rapidly through northern France and Belgium during late August and early September, with its main goal being to reach the Rhine before the Germans could establish defensive positions there. During the Battle of the Mons Pocket the Allies encircled approximately 70,000 Germans near Mons in Belgium, and took around 25,000 prisoners.

==== Aachen ====
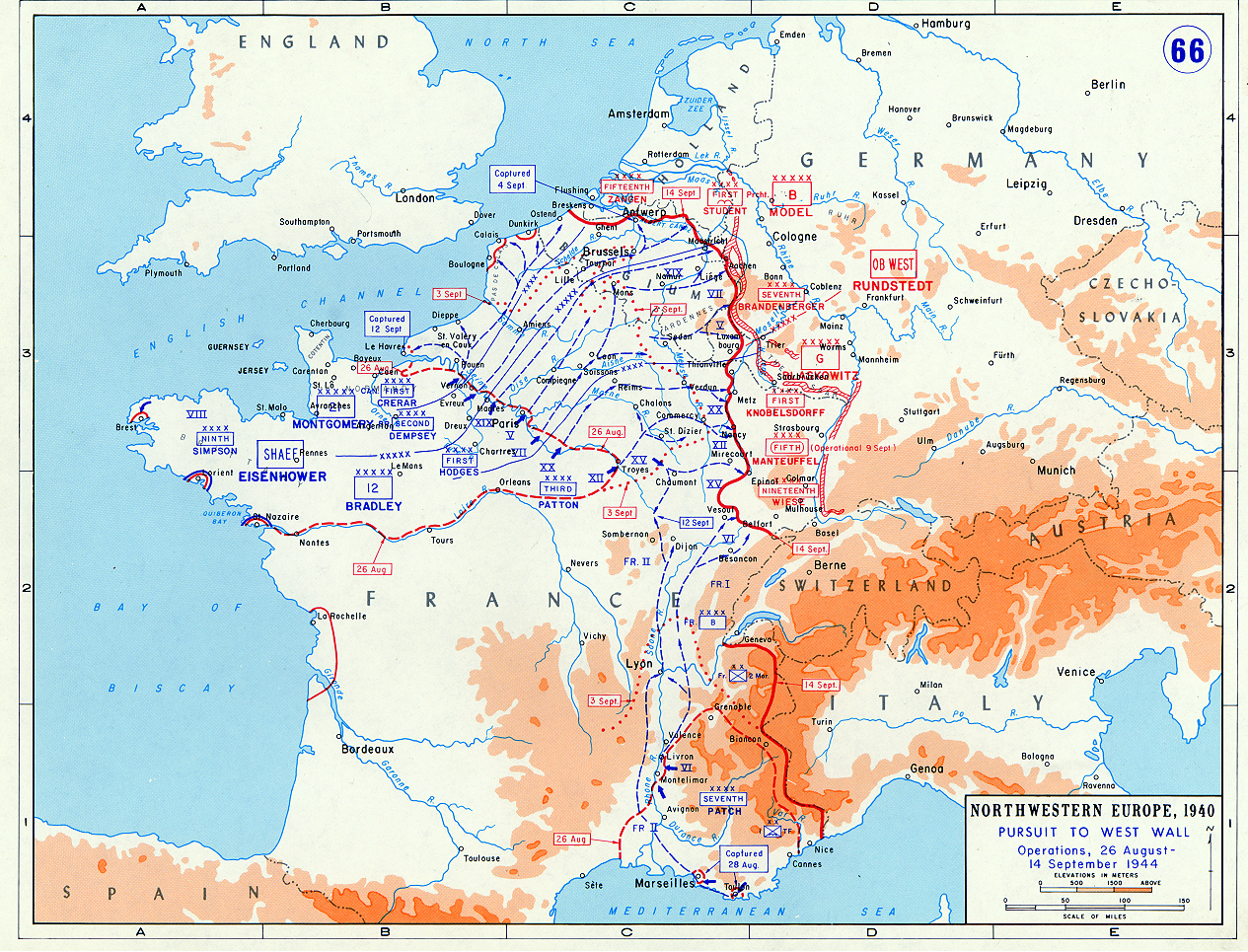
The advance of Allied forces between 26 August and 14 September 1944

The U.S. First Army was focused on capturing the city of Aachen, which had to be dealt with before advancing to assault the Siegfried Line itself. Initially, the city of Aachen was to be bypassed and cut off in an attempt by the Allies to imitate the Blitzkrieg tactics the Germans had so effectively used (see below). However, the city was the first to be assaulted on German soil and so had huge historical and cultural significance for the German people. Hitler personally ordered that the garrison there be reinforced and the city held. This forced the Allied commanders to re-think their strategy.

Some historians, including Stephen E. Ambrose, have suggested that the siege of Aachen was a mistake. The battle stalled the eastward advance by the Allies and caused approximately 5,000 Allied casualties. The fighting was, by all accounts, brutal street-to-street, house-to-house style urban combat and tied up the available resources of the advancing Allied armies. Ambrose has suggested that a more effective strategy would have been to isolate the garrison at Aachen and continue the move east into the heart of Germany. In theory, this would have eliminated the ability of the German garrison to operate as a fighting force by cutting off their supply lines. This might have forced them to surrender or to move out of the city in an attempt to re-establish their supply lines. In the case of the latter, a confrontation in a more neutral setting would probably have resulted in fewer military and civilian casualties.

==== Lorraine ====
In late August, the U.S. Third Army started to run low on fuel. This situation was caused by the rapid Allied advance through France, and compounded by the shift of logistical priority to the northern forces to secure Antwerp. By 1 September 1944, with the last of its fuel, the Third Army managed one final push to capture key bridges over the Meuse River at Verdun and Commercy. Five days after that, however, the critical supply situation effectively caused the Third Army to grind to a halt, allowing previously routed German forces to regroup and the reinforcement of their strongholds in the area.

Soon after, the Third Army came up against Metz, part of the Maginot Line and one of the most heavily fortified cities in Western Europe. The city could not be bypassed, as several of its forts had guns directed at Moselle crossing sites and the main roads in the area. It could also be used as a stronghold to organize a German counter-attack to the Third Army's rear. In the following Battle of Metz, the Third Army, while victorious, took heavy casualties.

Following Metz, the Third Army continued eastwards to the Saar River and soon began their assault on the Siegfried Line.

==== Hürtgen Forest ====
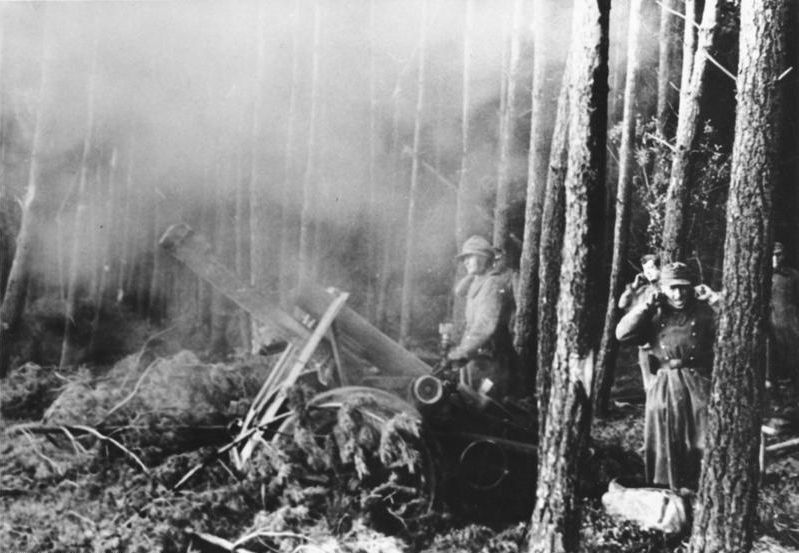
German troops defending the Hürtgen in November 1944.

Hürtgen Forest was seen as a possible location for incursions into the American flank, and the river dams in the area were a threat to the Allied advance downstream, so the Allies launched an assault to clear the area of German resistance on 19 September 1944. German defence was more stubborn than expected and the terrain was highly favourable to defence, largely negating the American advantages of numbers and quality of troops. The battle—expected to last a few weeks—continued until February 1945 and cost 33,000 casualties (from all causes).

The value of the battle has been disputed. Modern historians argue that the outcome was not worth the foreseeable losses, and in any case, the American tactics played into German hands.

==== Operation Queen ====
Operation Queen was a combined Allied air-ground offensive against the German forces at the Siegfried Line, which was conducted mainly by the combined effort of the U.S. Ninth and First Armies. The principal goal of the operation was to advance to the Roer River and to establish several bridgeheads over it, for a subsequent thrust into Germany to the Rhine River. Parts of this operation also included further fighting in the Hurtgen Forest. The offensive commenced on 16 November with one of the heaviest tactical air bombardments by the western Allies of the war. Although the German forces were heavily outnumbered, the Allied advance was very slow. After four weeks of intensive fighting, the Allies reached the Roer, but were not able to establish any bridgeheads over it. Fighting in the Hurtgen Forest also bogged down. The exhaustive fighting during Queen caused the Allied troops to suffer heavy casualties, and eventually the Germans launched their own counteroffensive—Operation Wacht am Rhein—on 16 December, which would lead to the Battle of the Bulge.

== Aftermath ==
=== Winter counter-offensives ===
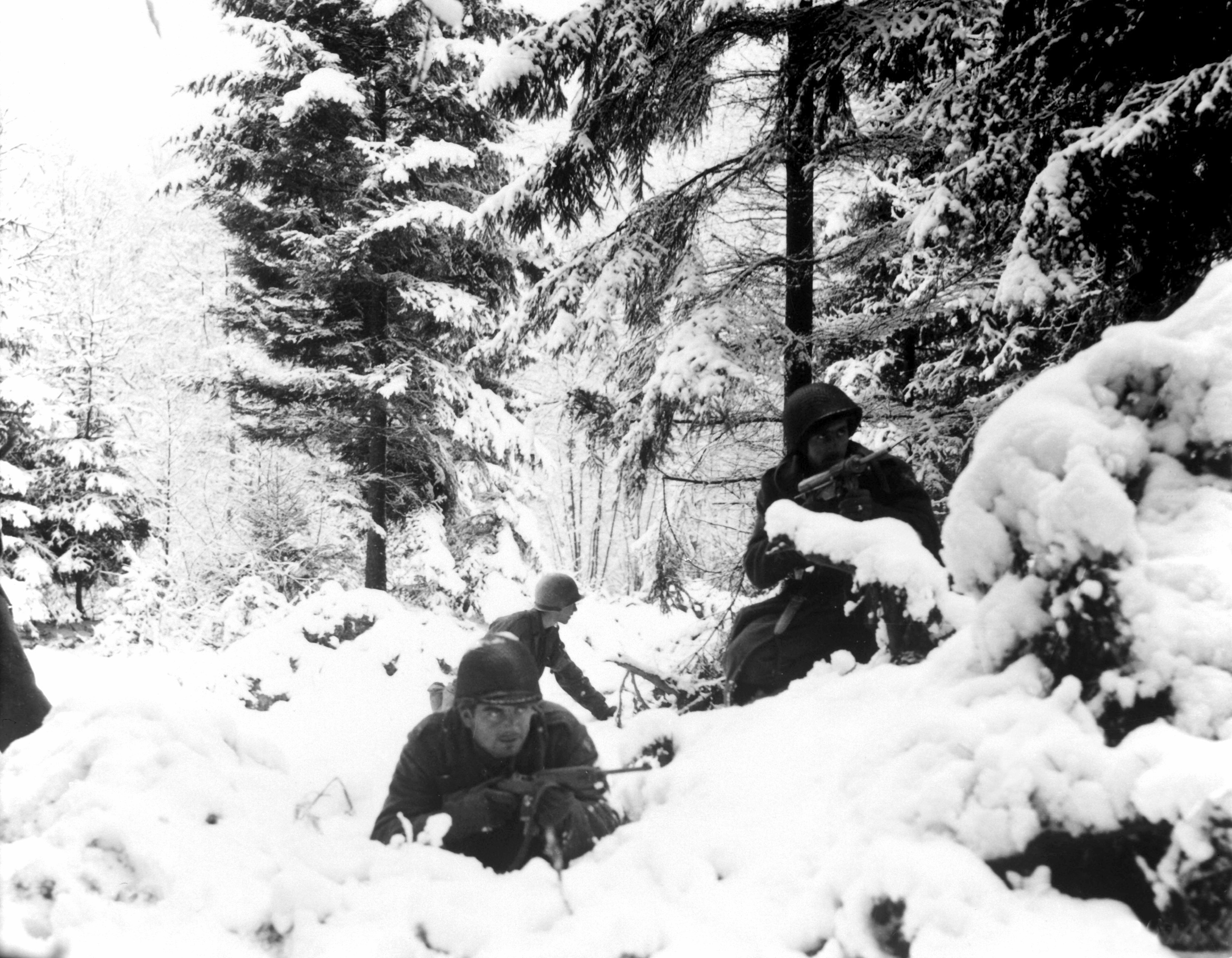
American soldiers taking up defensive positions in the Ardennes during the Battle of the Bulge.

The Germans had been preparing a massive counter-attack in the West since the Allied breakout from Normandy. The plan called Wacht am Rhein ("Watch on the Rhine") was to attack through the Ardennes and swing north to Antwerp, splitting the American and British armies. The attack started on 16 December in what became known as the Battle of the Bulge. Defending the Ardennes were troops of the U.S. First Army. After initial German successes in bad weather, which gave them cover from the Allied air forces, the Allies launched a counterattack to clear them from the Ardennes. The Germans were eventually pushed back to their starting points by 25 January 1945.

The Germans launched a second, smaller offensive (Nordwind) into Alsace on 1 January 1945. Aiming to recapture Strasbourg, they attacked the 6th Army Group at multiple points. Because Allied lines had become severely stretched in response to the crisis in the Ardennes, holding and throwing back the Nordwind offensive was a costly affair that lasted almost four weeks. Allied counter-attacks restored the front line to the area of the German border and collapsed the Colmar Pocket.

=== Germany west of the Rhine ===
The pincer movement of the Canadian First Army, advancing from the Nijmegen area in Operation Veritable, and the U.S. Ninth Army, crossing the Roer in Operation Grenade, was planned to start on 8 February 1945, but it was delayed by two weeks when the Germans flooded the Roer valley by destroying the floodgates of the dams on the upper Roer. During the two weeks that the little river was flooded, Hitler did not allow Rundstedt to withdraw German forces behind the Rhine, arguing that it would only delay the inevitable fight. Hitler ordered him to fight where his forces stood.

By the time the water had subsided and the U.S. Ninth Army was able to cross the Roer on 23 February, other Allied forces were also close to the Rhine's west bank. The German divisions that had remained on the west bank of the Rhine were cut to pieces, and 280,000 men were taken prisoner. The stubborn German resistance had been costly; their total losses reached an estimated 400,000 men.

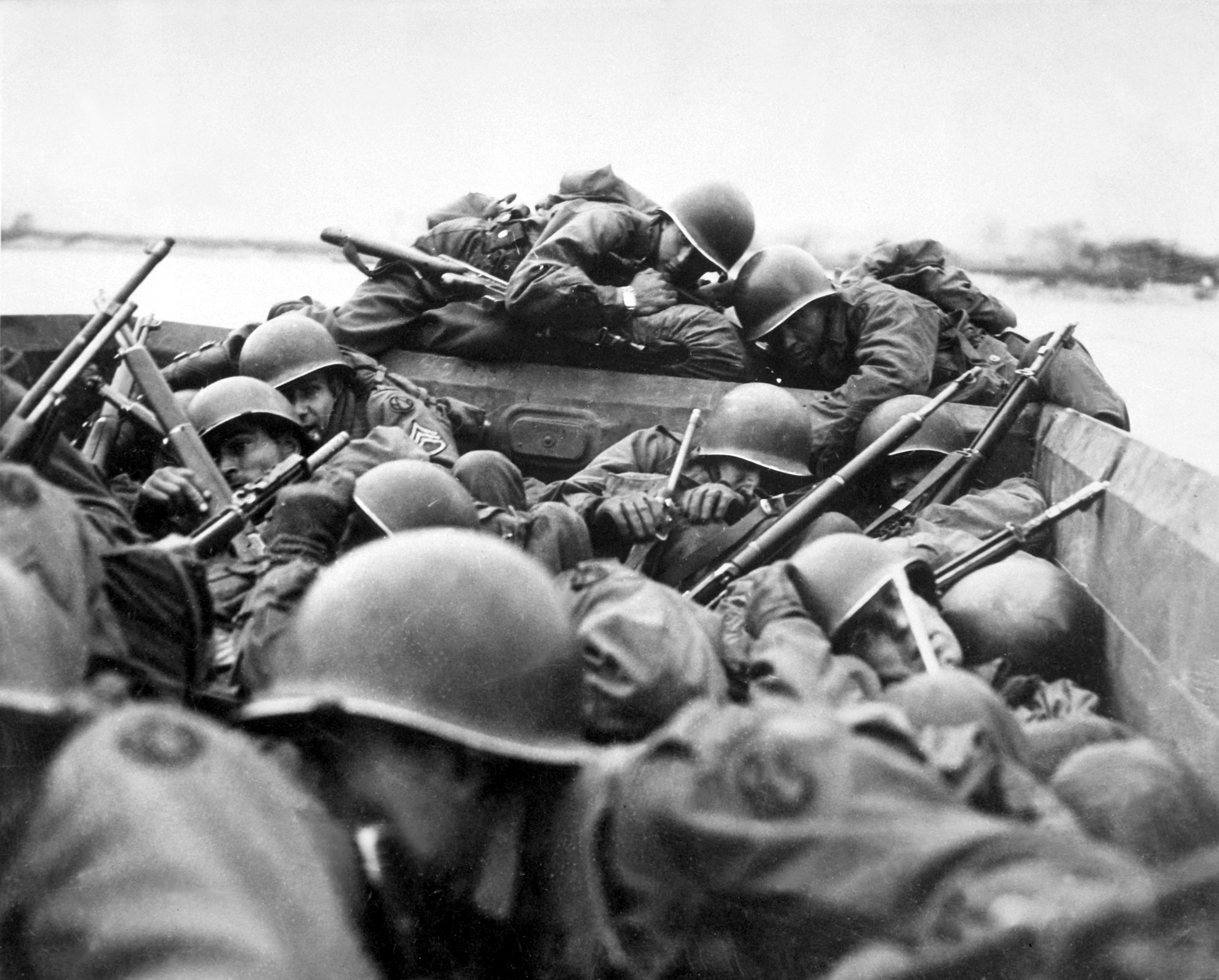
American soldiers crossing the Rhine river

The Allies crossed the Rhine at four points. One crossing was an opportunity taken by U.S. forces when the Germans failed to blow up the Ludendorff Bridge at Remagen; another was a hasty assault; and two crossings were planned:

- The U.S. First Army aggressively pursued the disintegrating German troops, and on 7 March they unexpectedly captured the Ludendorff Bridge across the Rhine River at Remagen. The 9th Armored Division quickly expanded the bridgehead into a full scale crossing.
- Bradley told General George S. Patton—whose U.S. Third Army had been fighting through the Palatinate—to "take the Rhine on the run". The Third Army did just that on the night of 22/23 March, crossing the river with a hasty assault south of Mainz at Oppenheim.
- In the north, the Rhine is twice as wide, with a far higher volume of water than where the Americans crossed. Montgomery, commander of the 21st Army Group, decided it could be crossed safely only with a carefully prepared attack. In Operation Plunder he crossed the Rhine at Rees and Wesel on the night of 23/24 March, including the largest single drop airborne operation in history, Operation Varsity.
- In the Allied 6th Army Group area, the U.S. Seventh Army assaulted across the Rhine in the area between Mannheim and Worms on 26 March. A fifth crossing on a smaller scale was later achieved by the French First Army at Speyer.

After crossing the Rhine, the Allies rapidly advanced into Germany's heartland. The end of World War II in Europe followed soon after with the surrender of Germany on 8 May.

== See also ==
- Liberation of France

== Bibliography ==
- Ballard, Ted (c. 1990). Rhineland 15 September 1944–21 March 1945. CMH Online bookshelves: World War II Commemorative Brochures. Washington: United States Army Center of Military History. CMH Pub 72-25. Archived from the original on 13 December 2007. PDF and EPUB formats.
- Neillands, Robin (2005). The Battle for the Rhine. Weidenfeld & Nicolson. ISBN 978-0-297-84617-8.
- Weigley, Russell F. (1981). Eisenhower's Lieutenants: The Campaign of France and Germany, 1944–1945. Bloomington, Indiana: Indiana Univ. Press. ISBN 0-253-20608-1.
- Zaloga, Steve; Dennis, Peter (2006). Remagen 1945: Endgame Against the Third Reich. Osprey Publishing. ISBN 1-84603-249-0.
- Ziemke, Earl F. (1990) [1975]. "Chapter X: The Rhineland Campaign". The US Army in the Occupation of Germany 1944–1946. Army Historical Series. Washington, D.C.: United States Army Center of Military History. CMH Pub 30-6. Archived from the original on 23 February 2017.
