= Saint-Pierre-de-l'Isle =

- Commune
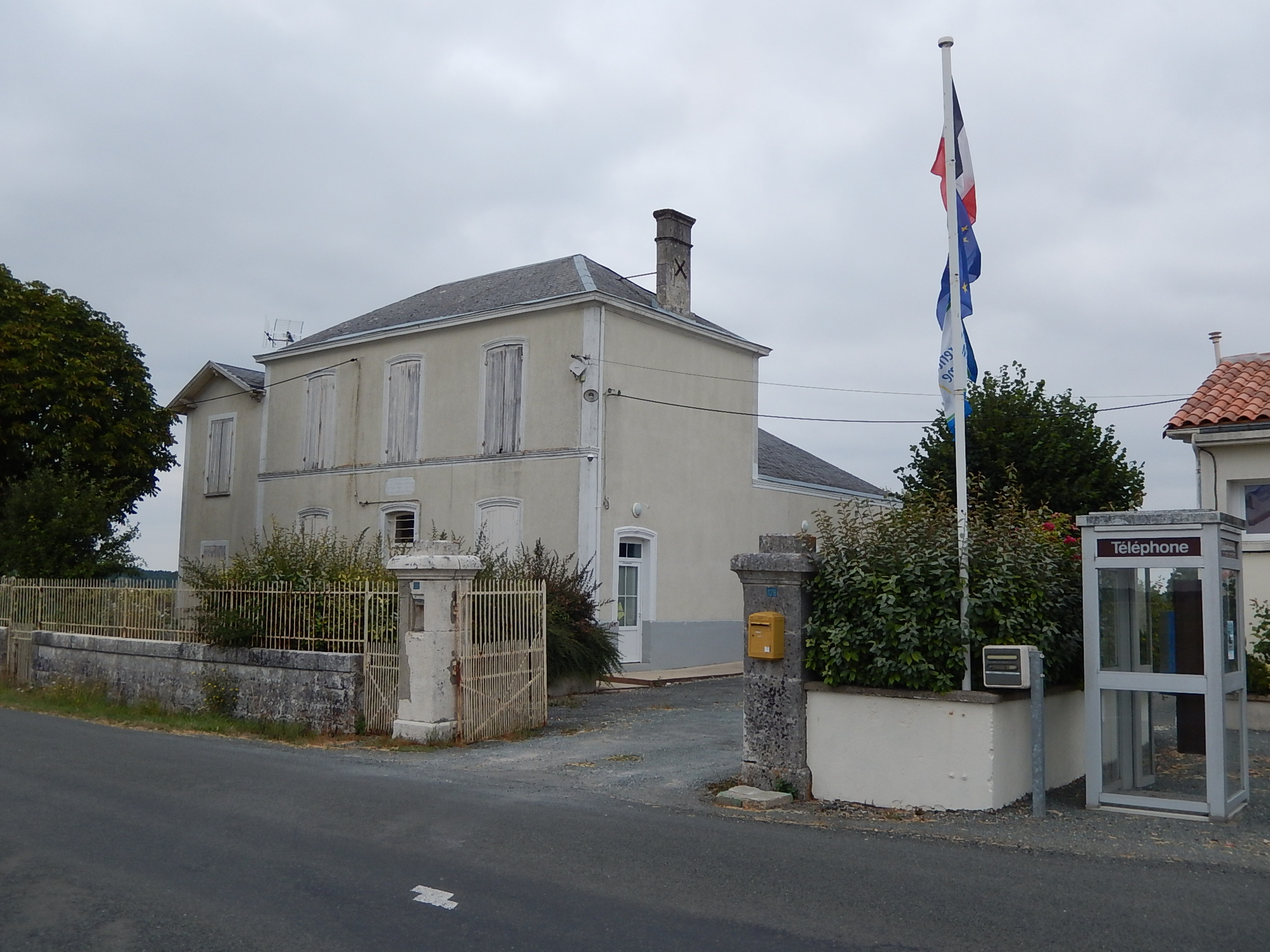
- The town hall in Saint-Pierre-de-l'Isle
- Location of Saint-Pierre-de-l'Isle
- Location within France Location within Nouvelle-Aquitaine
- Coordinates: 46°01′57″N 0°25′49″W
- Country: France
- Region: Nouvelle-Aquitaine
- Department: Charente-Maritime
- Arrondissement: Saint-Jean-d'Angély
- Canton: Matha

Government
  - Mayor (2020–2026): Michel Lalaizon
- Area^{1}: 6.43 km^{2} (2.48 sq mi)
- Elevation: 29 m (95 ft)
- Highest elevation: 52 m (171 ft)
- Lowest elevation: 23 m (75 ft)
- Population (2023): 248
  - Density: 38.6/km^{2} (99.9/sq mi)
- Time zone: UTC+01:00 (CET)
  - Summer (DST): UTC+02:00 (CEST)
- INSEE/Postal code: 17384 /17330
- ^{1} French Land Register data, which excludes lakes, ponds, glaciers > 1 km^{2} (0.386 sq mi or 247 acres) and river estuaries.

Saint-Pierre-de-l'Isle (French pronunciation: [sɛ̃ pjɛʁ də lil], before 2010: Saint-Pierre-de-l'Ile) is a commune in the Charente-Maritime department in southwestern France.

== Population ==
Historical population
Year	Pop.	±% p.a.
1968	350	—
1975	277	−3.29%
1982	311	+1.67%
1990	293	−0.74%
1999	262	−1.23%
2007	246	−0.78%
2012	272	+2.03%
2017	264	−0.60%
2023	248	−1.04%
Source: INSEE

== Geography ==
The commune is traversed by the river Boutonne.

== See also ==
- Communes of the Charente-Maritime department
