= Blanzay-sur-Boutonne =

- Commune
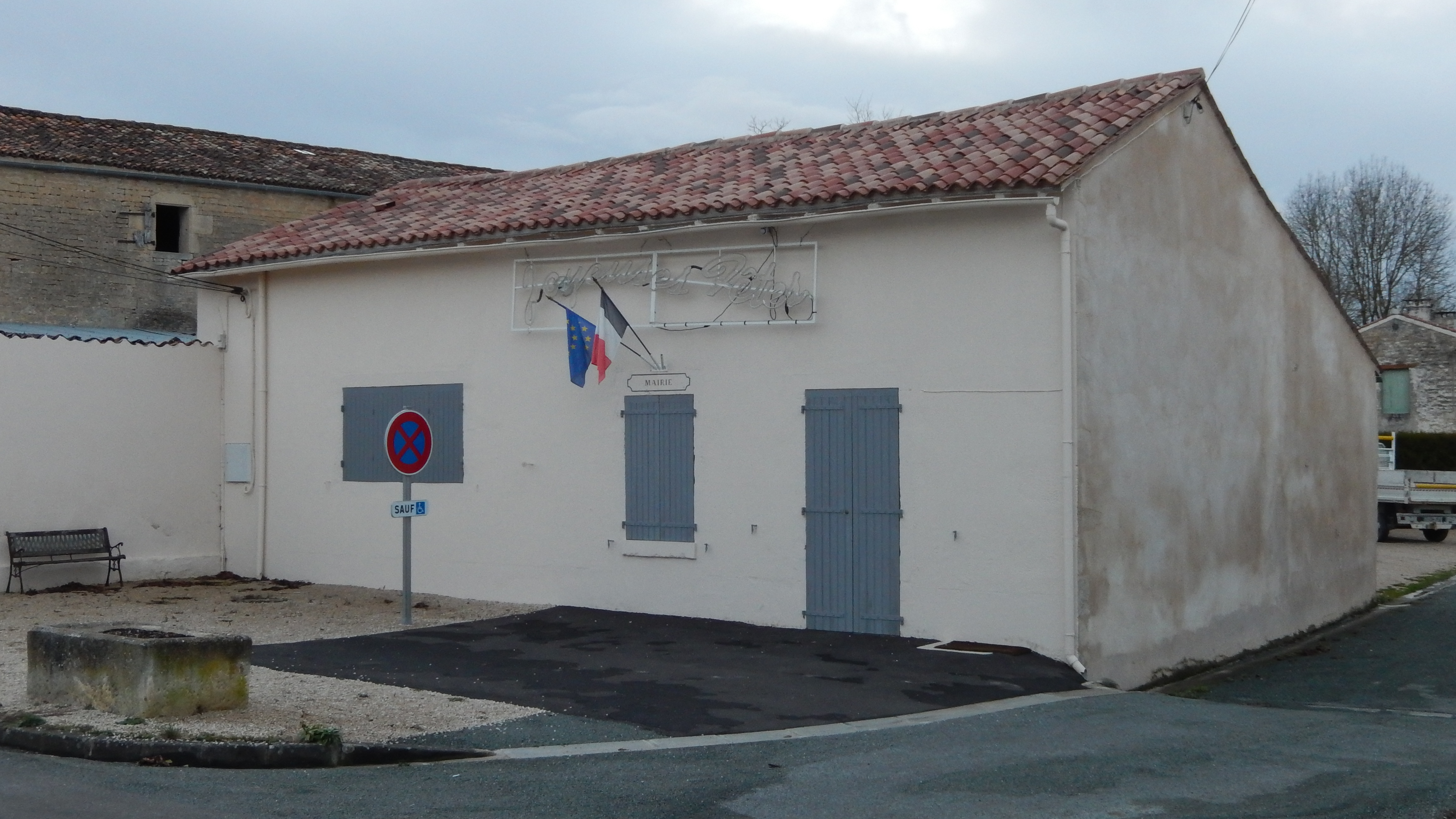
- The town hall in Blanzay-sur-Boutonne
- Location of Blanzay-sur-Boutonne
- Location within France Location within Nouvelle-Aquitaine
- Coordinates: 46°03′02″N 0°25′42″W
- Country: France
- Region: Nouvelle-Aquitaine
- Department: Charente-Maritime
- Arrondissement: Saint-Jean-d'Angély
- Canton: Matha
- Intercommunality: Vals de Saintonge

Government
  - Mayor (2020–2026): Jean-Luc Duguy
- Area^{1}: 5.75 km^{2} (2.22 sq mi)
- Highest elevation: 57 m (187 ft)
- Lowest elevation: 26 m (85 ft)
- Population (2023): 76
  - Density: 13/km^{2} (34/sq mi)
- Time zone: UTC+01:00 (CET)
  - Summer (DST): UTC+02:00 (CEST)
- INSEE/Postal code: 17049 /17470
- ^{1} French Land Register data, which excludes lakes, ponds, glaciers > 1 km^{2} (0.386 sq mi or 247 acres) and river estuaries.

Blanzay-sur-Boutonne (French pronunciation: [blɑ̃zɛ syʁ butɔn], literally Blanzay on Boutonne) is a commune in the Charente-Maritime department in the Nouvelle-Aquitaine region in southwestern France.

== Geography ==
The Boutonne forms the commune's northwestern and western borders.

== Population ==
Historical population
Year	Pop.	±% p.a.
1968	146	—
1975	134	−1.22%
1982	105	−3.42%
1990	83	−2.90%
1999	86	+0.40%
2007	93	+0.98%
2012	90	−0.65%
2017	82	−1.84%
2023	76	−1.26%
Source: INSEE

== See also ==
- Communes of the Charente-Maritime department
