= Les Églises-d'Argenteuil =

- Commune
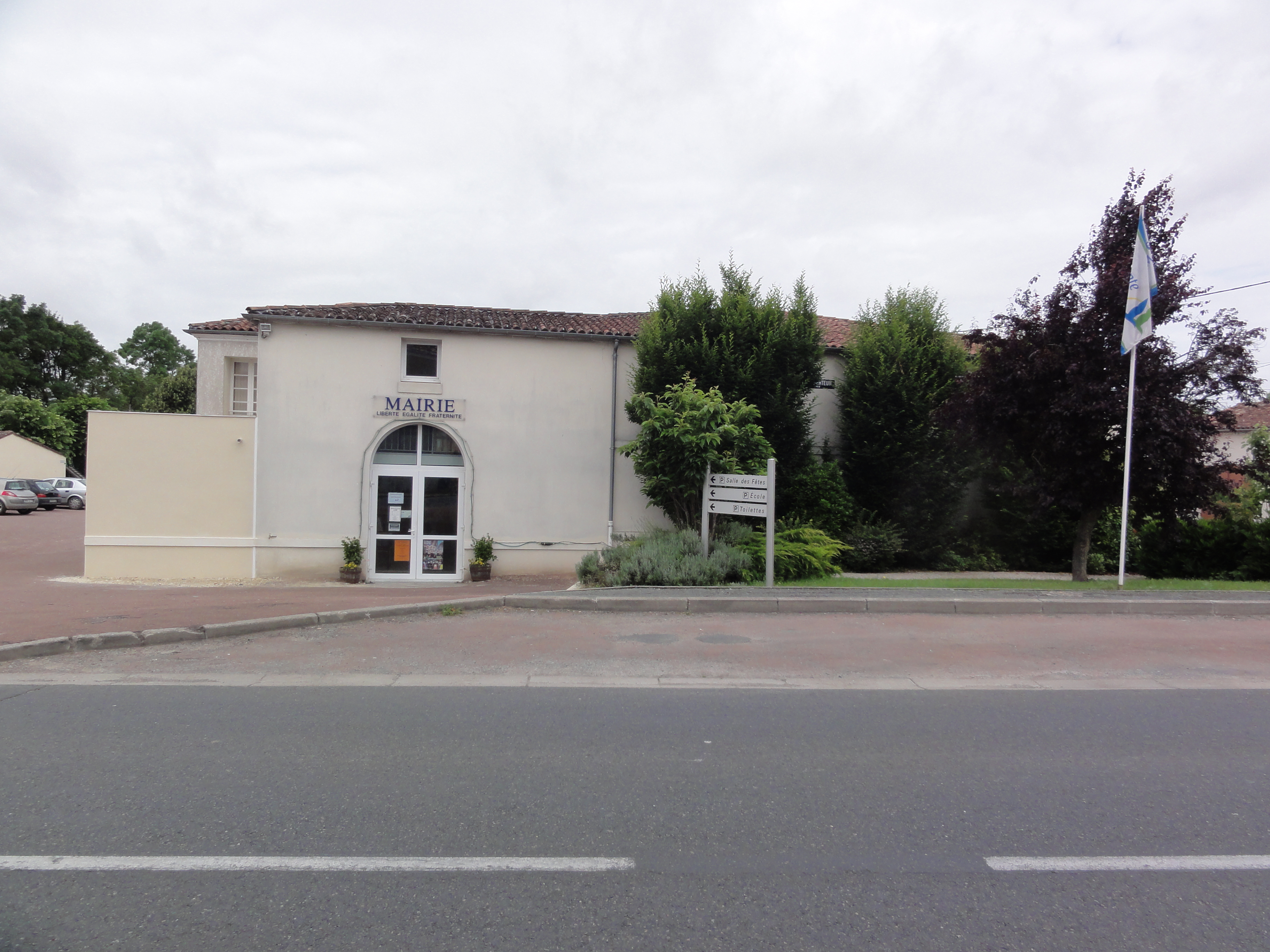
- The town hall in Les Églises-d'Argenteuil
- Location of Les Églises-d'Argenteuil
- Location within France Location within Nouvelle-Aquitaine
- Coordinates: 45°58′28″N 0°25′54″W
- Country: France
- Region: Nouvelle-Aquitaine
- Department: Charente-Maritime
- Arrondissement: Saint-Jean-d'Angély
- Canton: Matha
- Intercommunality: Vals de Saintonge

Government
  - Mayor (2020–2026): Roseline Gicquel
- Area^{1}: 14.29 km^{2} (5.52 sq mi)
- Elevation: 20 m (66 ft)
- Highest elevation: 82 m (269 ft)
- Lowest elevation: 20 m (66 ft)
- Population (2023): 537
  - Density: 37.6/km^{2} (97.3/sq mi)
- Time zone: UTC+01:00 (CET)
  - Summer (DST): UTC+02:00 (CEST)
- INSEE/Postal code: 17150 /17400
- ^{1} French Land Register data, which excludes lakes, ponds, glaciers > 1 km^{2} (0.386 sq mi or 247 acres) and river estuaries.

Les Églises-d'Argenteuil (French pronunciation: [le.z‿eɡliz daʁʒɑ̃tœj]) is a commune in the Charente-Maritime department in southwestern France.

== Geography ==
The river Boutonne forms part of the commune's northwestern border.

== Population ==
Historical population
| Year | Pop. | ±% p.a. |
|---|---|---|
| 1968 | 572 | — |
| 1975 | 518 | −1.41% |
| 1982 | 530 | +0.33% |
| 1990 | 545 | +0.35% |
| 1999 | 507 | −0.80% |
| 2007 | 523 | +0.39% |
| 2012 | 529 | +0.23% |
| 2017 | 519 | −0.38% |
| 2023 | 537 | +0.57% |
Source: INSEE

== See also ==
- Communes of the Charente-Maritime department
