= Saint-Julien-de-l'Escap =

- Commune
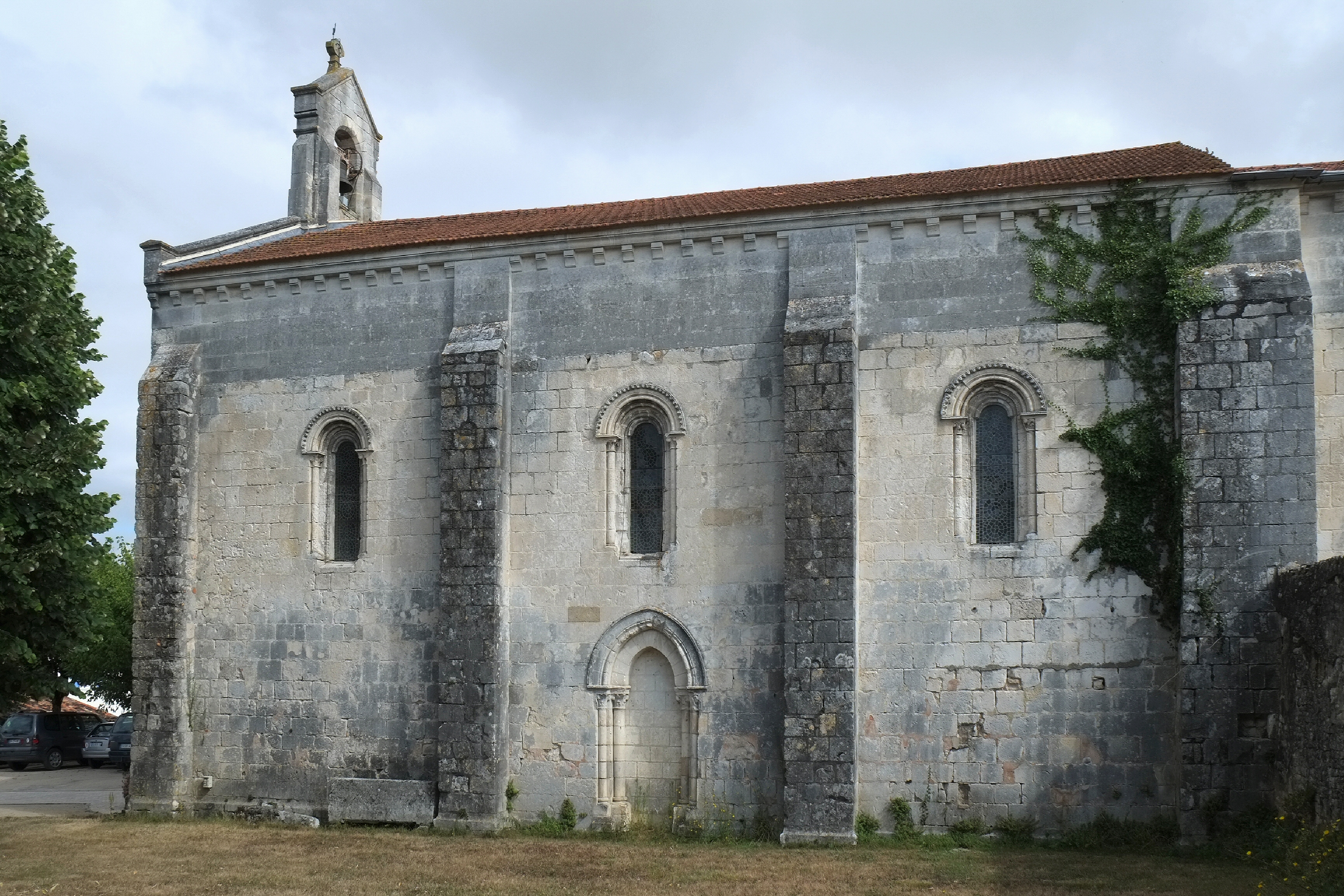
- The church in Saint-Julien-de-l'Escap
- Location of Saint-Julien-de-l'Escap
- Location within France Location within Nouvelle-Aquitaine
- Coordinates: 45°56′05″N 0°29′20″W
- Country: France
- Region: Nouvelle-Aquitaine
- Department: Charente-Maritime
- Arrondissement: Saint-Jean-d'Angély
- Canton: Matha

Government
  - Mayor (2020–2026): Frédéric Emard
- Area^{1}: 8.68 km^{2} (3.35 sq mi)
- Elevation: 20 m (66 ft)
- Highest elevation: 66 m (217 ft)
- Lowest elevation: 12 m (39 ft)
- Population (2023): 857
  - Density: 98.7/km^{2} (256/sq mi)
- Time zone: UTC+01:00 (CET)
  - Summer (DST): UTC+02:00 (CEST)
- INSEE/Postal code: 17350 /17400
- ^{1} French Land Register data, which excludes lakes, ponds, glaciers > 1 km^{2} (0.386 sq mi or 247 acres) and river estuaries.

Saint-Julien-de-l'Escap (French pronunciation: [sɛ̃ ʒyljɛ̃ də lɛskap]) is a commune in the Charente-Maritime department in southwestern France.

== Geography ==
The commune is traversed by the river Boutonne.

== Population ==
Historical population
Year	Pop.	±% p.a.
1968	581	—
1975	864	+5.83%
1982	898	+0.55%
1990	838	−0.86%
1999	767	−0.98%
2007	911	+2.17%
2012	833	−1.77%
2017	891	+1.36%
2023	857	−0.65%
Source: INSEE

== See also ==
- Communes of the Charente-Maritime department
