= Saint-Georges-de-Longuepierre =

- Part of Rives-de-Boutonne
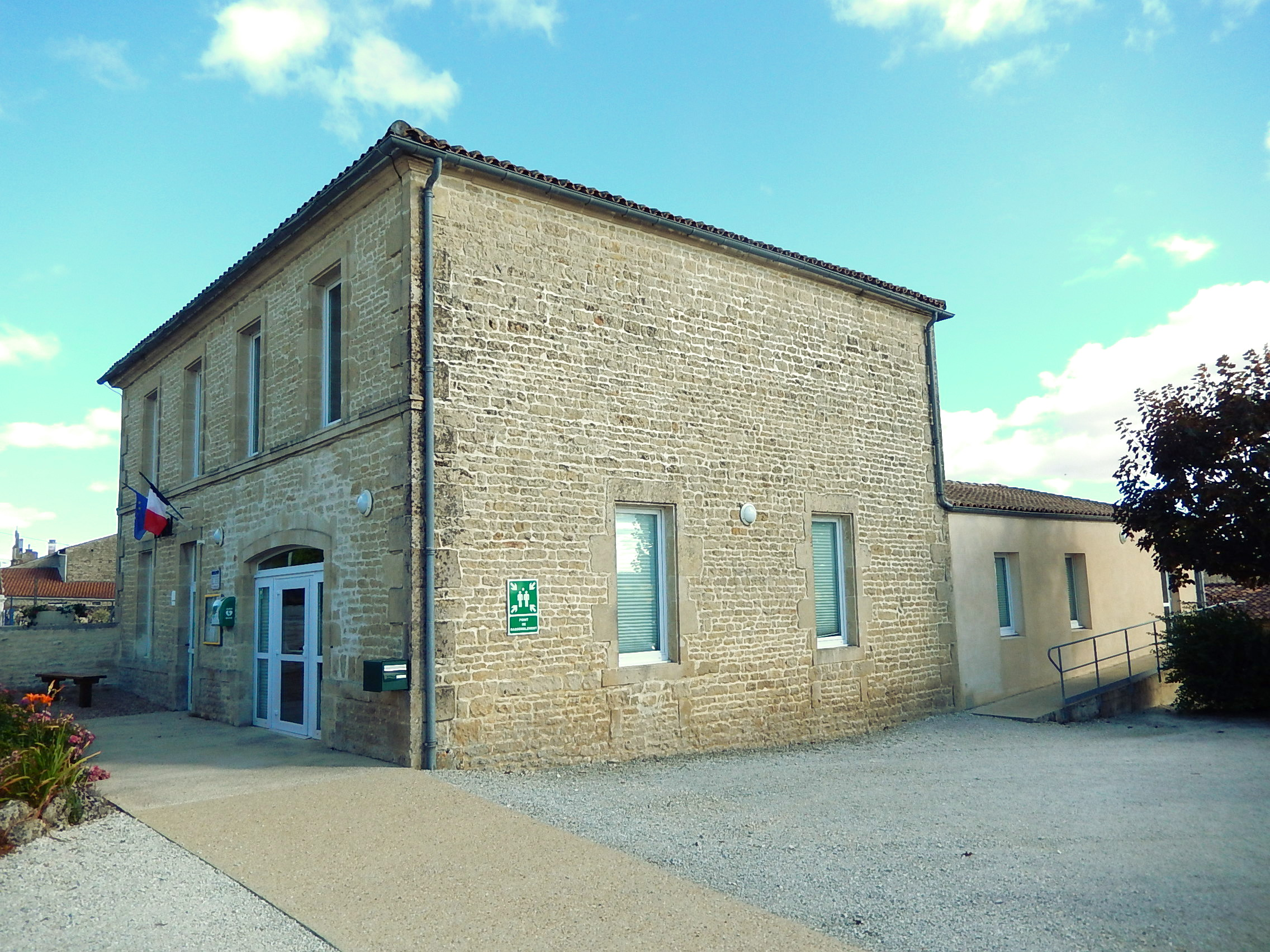
- The town hall in Saint-Georges-de-Longuepierre
- Location of Saint-Georges-de-Longuepierre
- Location within France Location within Nouvelle-Aquitaine
- Coordinates: 46°02′35″N 0°23′50″W
- Country: France
- Region: Nouvelle-Aquitaine
- Department: Charente-Maritime
- Arrondissement: Saint-Jean-d'Angély
- Canton: Matha
- Commune: Rives-de-Boutonne
- Area^{1}: 10.69 km^{2} (4.13 sq mi)
- Elevation: 44 m (144 ft)
- Highest elevation: 82 m (269 ft)
- Lowest elevation: 25 m (82 ft)
- Population (2023): 235
  - Density: 22.0/km^{2} (56.9/sq mi)
- Time zone: UTC+01:00 (CET)
  - Summer (DST): UTC+02:00 (CEST)
- Postal code: 17470
- ^{1} French Land Register data, which excludes lakes, ponds, glaciers > 1 km^{2} (0.386 sq mi or 247 acres) and river estuaries.

Saint-Georges-de-Longuepierre (French pronunciation: [sɛ̃ ʒɔʁʒ də lɔ̃ɡpjɛʁ]) is a former commune in the Charente-Maritime department in southwestern France. It was merged with Nuaillé-sur-Boutonne to form Rives-de-Boutonne on 1 January 2025.

== Geography ==
The river Boutonne forms part of the commune's western border.

== See also ==
- Communes of the Charente-Maritime department
