= Saint-Pardoult =

- Commune
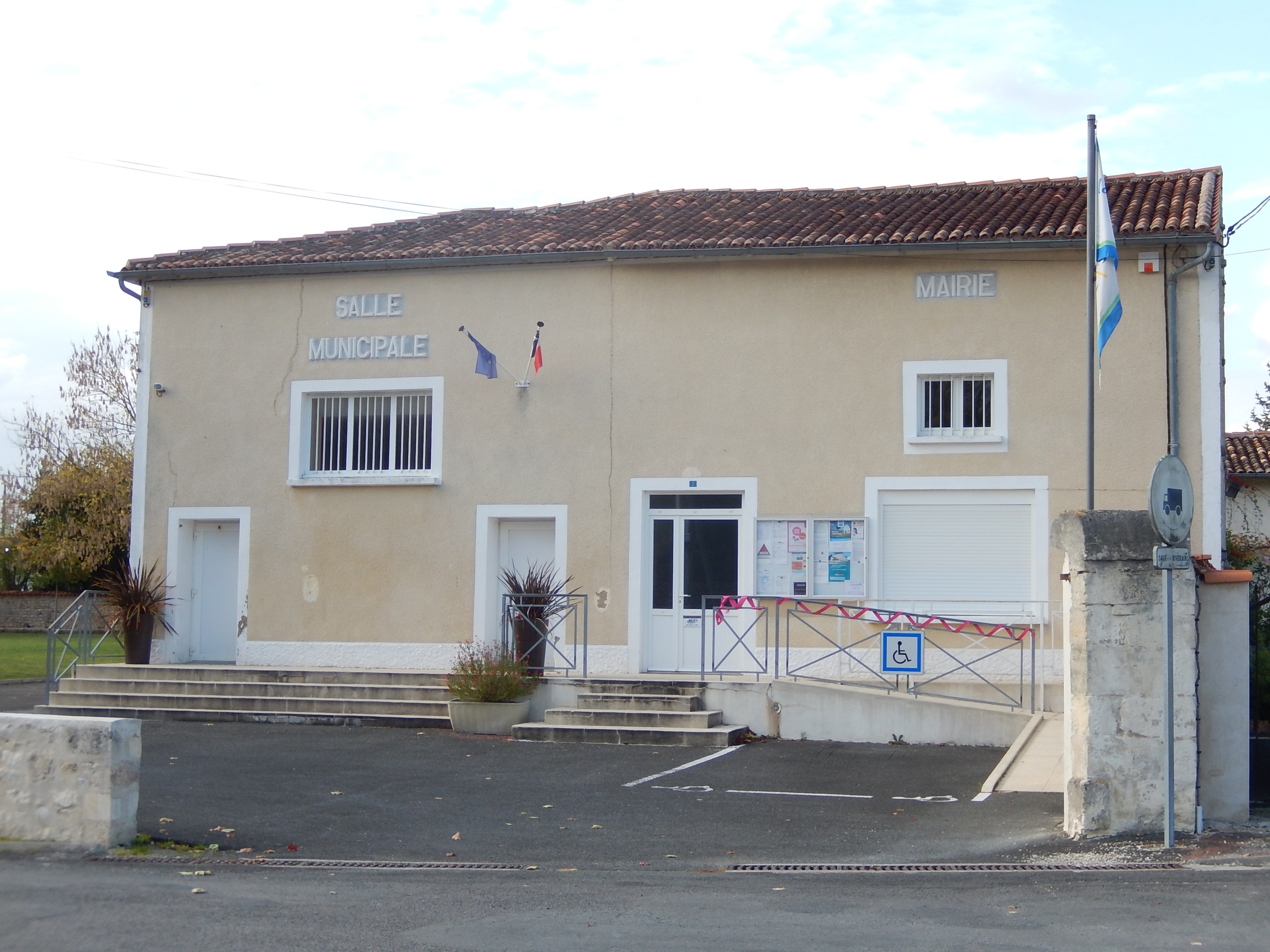
- The town hall in Saint-Pardoult
- Location of Saint-Pardoult
- Location within France Location within Nouvelle-Aquitaine
- Coordinates: 45°59′57″N 0°26′55″W
- Country: France
- Region: Nouvelle-Aquitaine
- Department: Charente-Maritime
- Arrondissement: Saint-Jean-d'Angély
- Canton: Matha

Government
  - Mayor (2020–2026): Dominique Guillon
- Area^{1}: 5.60 km^{2} (2.16 sq mi)
- Elevation: 25 m (82 ft)
- Highest elevation: 53 m (174 ft)
- Lowest elevation: 21 m (69 ft)
- Population (2023): 211
  - Density: 37.7/km^{2} (97.6/sq mi)
- Time zone: UTC+01:00 (CET)
  - Summer (DST): UTC+02:00 (CEST)
- INSEE/Postal code: 17381 /17400
- ^{1} French Land Register data, which excludes lakes, ponds, glaciers > 1 km^{2} (0.386 sq mi or 247 acres) and river estuaries.

Saint-Pardoult (French pronunciation: [sɛ̃ paʁdu]) is a commune in the Charente-Maritime department in southwestern France.

== Geography ==
The village lies on the right bank of the Boutonne, which forms all of the commune's eastern border.

== Population ==
Historical population
Year	Pop.	±% p.a.
1968	238	—
1975	219	−1.18%
1982	173	−3.31%
1990	185	+0.84%
1999	192	+0.41%
2007	204	+0.76%
2012	222	+1.71%
2017	241	+1.66%
2023	211	−2.19%
Source: INSEE

== See also ==
- Communes of the Charente-Maritime department
