= Poursay-Garnaud =

- Commune
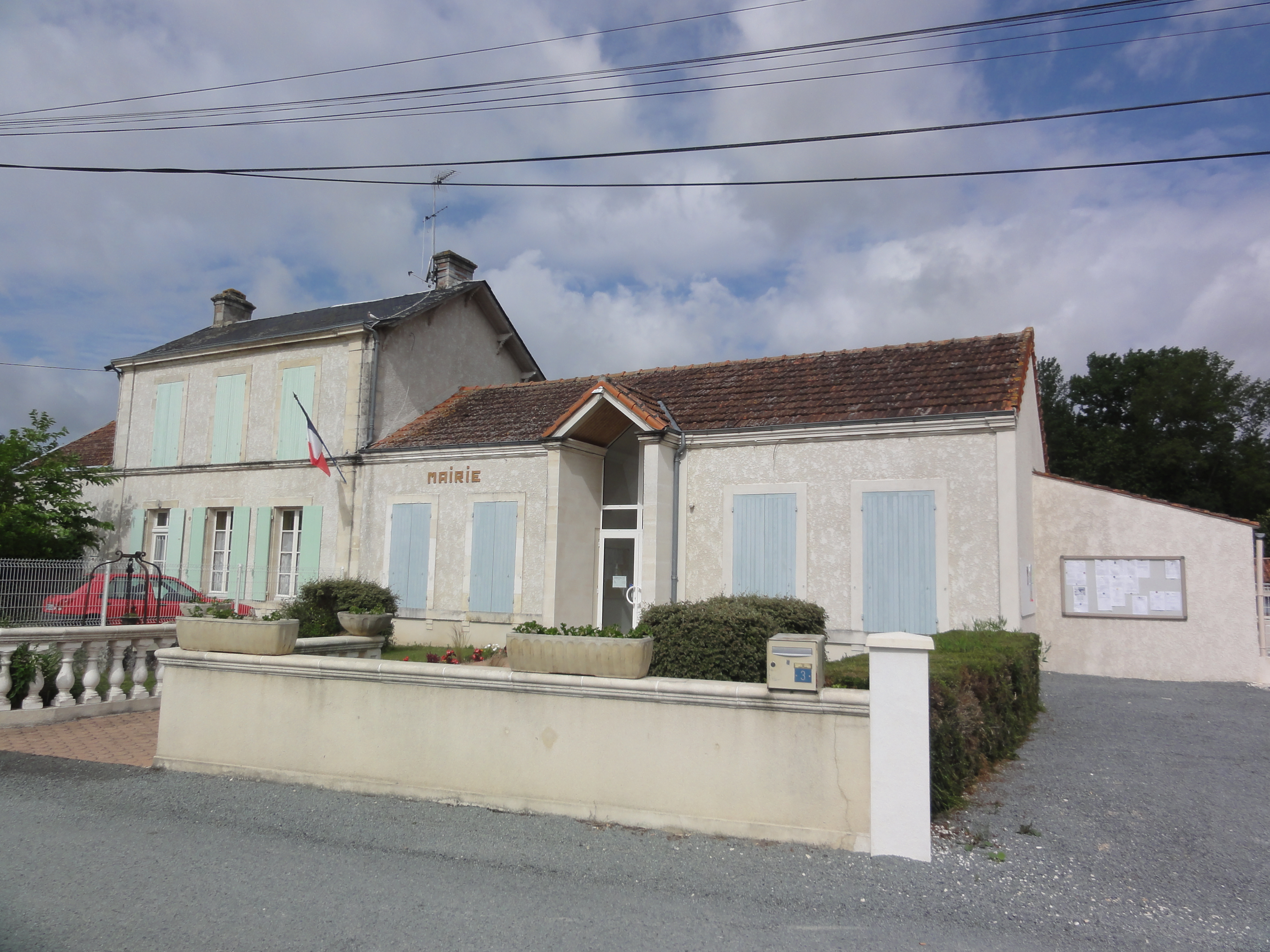
- The town hall in Poursay-Garnaud
- Location of Poursay-Garnaud
- Location within France Location within Nouvelle-Aquitaine
- Coordinates: 45°57′27″N 0°27′23″W
- Country: France
- Region: Nouvelle-Aquitaine
- Department: Charente-Maritime
- Arrondissement: Saint-Jean-d'Angély
- Canton: Matha

Government
  - Mayor (2020–2026): Dominique Bouin
- Area^{1}: 5.22 km^{2} (2.02 sq mi)
- Elevation: 15 m (49 ft)
- Highest elevation: 69 m (226 ft)
- Lowest elevation: 16 m (52 ft)
- Population (2023): 309
  - Density: 59.2/km^{2} (153/sq mi)
- Time zone: UTC+01:00 (CET)
  - Summer (DST): UTC+02:00 (CEST)
- INSEE/Postal code: 17288 /17400
- ^{1} French Land Register data, which excludes lakes, ponds, glaciers > 1 km^{2} (0.386 sq mi or 247 acres) and river estuaries.

Poursay-Garnaud (French pronunciation: [puʁsɛ ɡaʁno]) is a commune in the Charente-Maritime department in southwestern France.

== Geography ==
The village lies on the left bank of the Boutonne, which forms all of the commune's northwestern border.

== Population ==
Historical population
Year	Pop.	±% p.a.
1968	236	—
1975	212	−1.52%
1982	228	+1.04%
1990	236	+0.43%
1999	238	+0.09%
2007	288	+2.41%
2012	305	+1.15%
2017	315	+0.65%
2023	309	−0.32%
Source: INSEE

== See also ==
- Communes of the Charente-Maritime department
