= Nuaillé-sur-Boutonne =

- Part of Rives-de-Boutonne
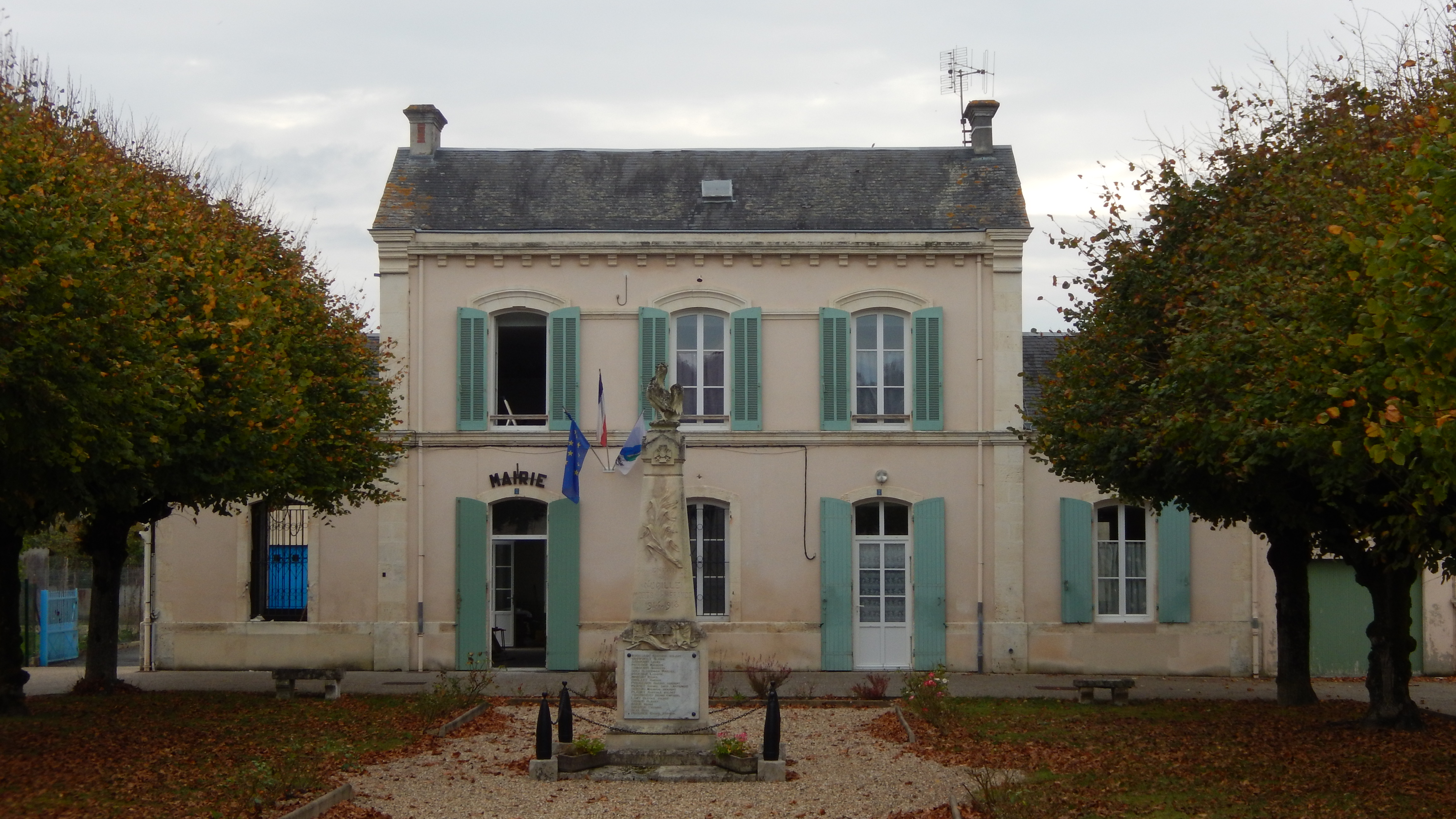
- The town hall in Nuaillé-sur-Boutonne
- Location of Nuaillé-sur-Boutonne
- Location within France Location within Nouvelle-Aquitaine
- Coordinates: 46°00′52″N 0°26′00″W
- Country: France
- Region: Nouvelle-Aquitaine
- Department: Charente-Maritime
- Arrondissement: Saint-Jean-d'Angély
- Canton: Matha
- Commune: Rives-de-Boutonne
- Area^{1}: 10.48 km^{2} (4.05 sq mi)
- Highest elevation: 62 m (203 ft)
- Lowest elevation: 21 m (69 ft)
- Population (2023): 184
  - Density: 17.6/km^{2} (45.5/sq mi)
- Time zone: UTC+01:00 (CET)
  - Summer (DST): UTC+02:00 (CEST)
- Postal code: 17470
- ^{1} French Land Register data, which excludes lakes, ponds, glaciers > 1 km^{2} (0.386 sq mi or 247 acres) and river estuaries.

Nuaillé-sur-Boutonne (French pronunciation: [nɥaje syʁ butɔn], lit. 'Nuaillé on Boutonne') is a former commune in the Charente-Maritime department in southwestern France. It was merged with Saint-Georges-de-Longuepierre to form Rives-de-Boutonne on 1 January 2025.

== Geography ==
The village lies on the left bank of the river Boutonne, which formed most of the commune's western border.

== See also ==
- Communes of the Charente-Maritime department
