= Vervant, Charente-Maritime =

Vervant
- Commune
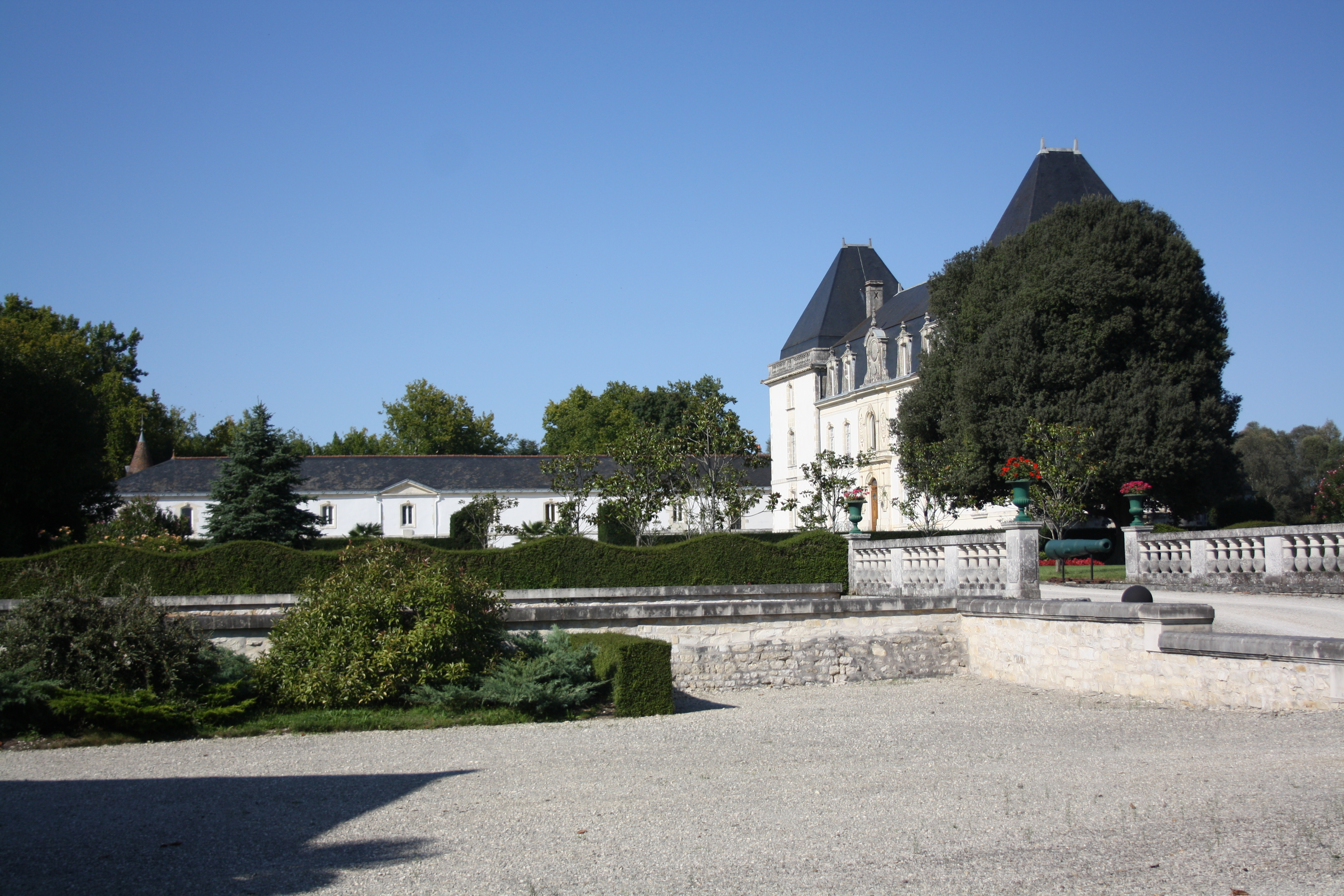
- Chateau
- Location of Vervant
- Location within France Location within Nouvelle-Aquitaine
- Coordinates: 45°58′28″N 0°27′11″W
- Country: France
- Region: Nouvelle-Aquitaine
- Department: Charente-Maritime
- Arrondissement: Saint-Jean-d'Angély
- Canton: Matha
- Intercommunality: Vals de Saintonge

Government
  - Mayor (2020–2026): Marie-José Trichet
- Area^{1}: 5.62 km^{2} (2.17 sq mi)
- Elevation: 25 m (82 ft)
- Highest elevation: 71 m (233 ft)
- Lowest elevation: 18 m (59 ft)
- Population (2023): 252
  - Density: 44.8/km^{2} (116/sq mi)
- Time zone: UTC+01:00 (CET)
  - Summer (DST): UTC+02:00 (CEST)
- INSEE/Postal code: 17467 /17400
- ^{1} French Land Register data, which excludes lakes, ponds, glaciers > 1 km^{2} (0.386 sq mi or 247 acres) and river estuaries.

Vervant (French pronunciation: [vɛʁvɑ̃]) is a commune in the Charente-Maritime department in southwestern France.

== Geography ==
The village lies on the left bank of the Boutonne, which forms all of the commune's western border.

== Population ==
Historical population
Year	Pop.	±% p.a.
1968	185	—
1975	153	−2.68%
1982	201	+3.98%
1990	175	−1.72%
1999	194	+1.15%
2007	204	+0.63%
2012	228	+2.25%
2017	238	+0.86%
2023	252	+0.96%
Source: INSEE

== See also ==
- Communes of the Charente-Maritime department
