= Coivert =

- Commune
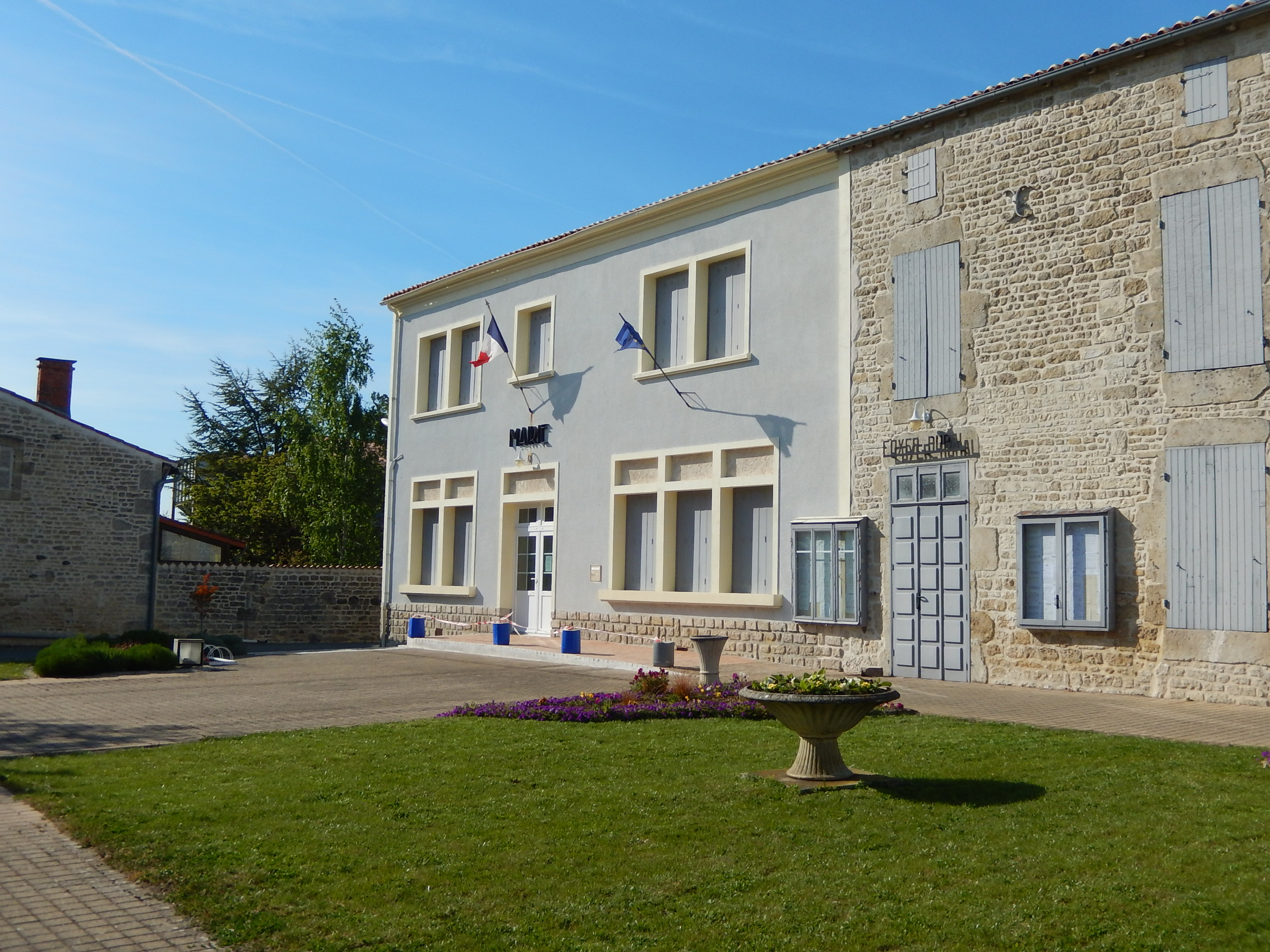
- The town hall in Coivert
- Location of Coivert
- Location within France Location within Nouvelle-Aquitaine
- Coordinates: 46°04′14″N 0°27′28″W
- Country: France
- Region: Nouvelle-Aquitaine
- Department: Charente-Maritime
- Arrondissement: Saint-Jean-d'Angély
- Canton: Matha

Government
  - Mayor (2020–2026): Marie-Noëlle Giraud
- Area^{1}: 14.78 km^{2} (5.71 sq mi)
- Highest elevation: 81 m (266 ft)
- Lowest elevation: 27 m (89 ft)
- Population (2023): 190
  - Density: 13/km^{2} (33/sq mi)
- Time zone: UTC+01:00 (CET)
  - Summer (DST): UTC+02:00 (CEST)
- INSEE/Postal code: 17114 /17330
- ^{1} French Land Register data, which excludes lakes, ponds, glaciers > 1 km^{2} (0.386 sq mi or 247 acres) and river estuaries.

Coivert (French pronunciation: [kwavɛʁ]) is a commune in the Charente-Maritime department in southwestern France.

== Geography ==
The Boutonne forms most of the commune's eastern border.

== Population ==
Historical population
Year	Pop.	±% p.a.
1968	275	—
1975	249	−1.41%
1982	245	−0.23%
1990	222	−1.22%
1999	219	−0.15%
2007	232	+0.72%
2012	239	+0.60%
2017	213	−2.28%
2023	190	−1.89%
Source: INSEE

== See also ==
- Communes of the Charente-Maritime department
