= Antezant-la-Chapelle =

- Commune
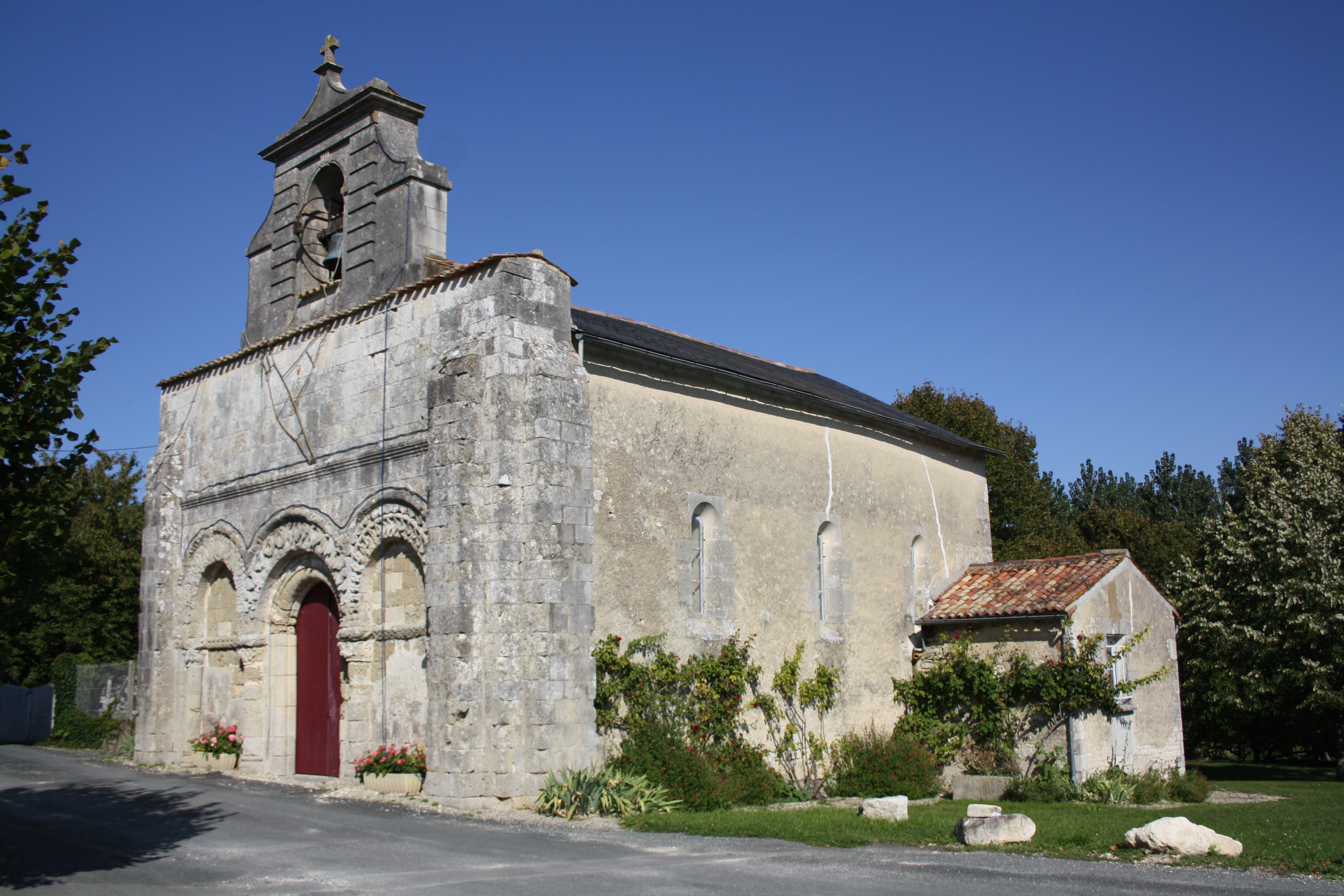
- The church in Antezant-la-Chapelle
- Location of Antezant-la-Chapelle
- Location within France Location within Nouvelle-Aquitaine
- Coordinates: 45°59′00″N 0°27′18″W
- Country: France
- Region: Nouvelle-Aquitaine
- Department: Charente-Maritime
- Arrondissement: Saint-Jean-d'Angély
- Canton: Matha

Government
  - Mayor (2020–2026): Eric Poisbelaud
- Area^{1}: 18.63 km^{2} (7.19 sq mi)
- Elevation: 30 m (98 ft)
- Highest elevation: 89 m (292 ft)
- Lowest elevation: 18 m (59 ft)
- Population (2023): 367
  - Density: 19.7/km^{2} (51.0/sq mi)
- Time zone: UTC+01:00 (CET)
  - Summer (DST): UTC+02:00 (CEST)
- INSEE/Postal code: 17013 /17400
- ^{1} French Land Register data, which excludes lakes, ponds, glaciers > 1 km^{2} (0.386 sq mi or 247 acres) and river estuaries.

Antezant-la-Chapelle (French pronunciation: [ɑ̃tzɑ̃ la ʃapɛl]) is a commune in the Charente-Maritime department in the Nouvelle-Aquitaine region in southwestern France. It was created in 1974 by the merger of two former communes: Antezant and La Chapelle-Bâton.

== Geography ==
The river Boutonne forms most of the commune's eastern border.

== Population ==
Historical population
Year	Pop.	±% p.a.
1968	383	—
1975	333	−1.98%
1982	352	+0.80%
1990	353	+0.04%
1999	339	−0.45%
2007	359	+0.72%
2012	362	+0.17%
2017	349	−0.73%
2023	367	+0.84%
Source: INSEE

== See also ==
- Communes of the Charente-Maritime department
