= Saint-Martial, Charente-Maritime =

Saint-Martial
- Commune
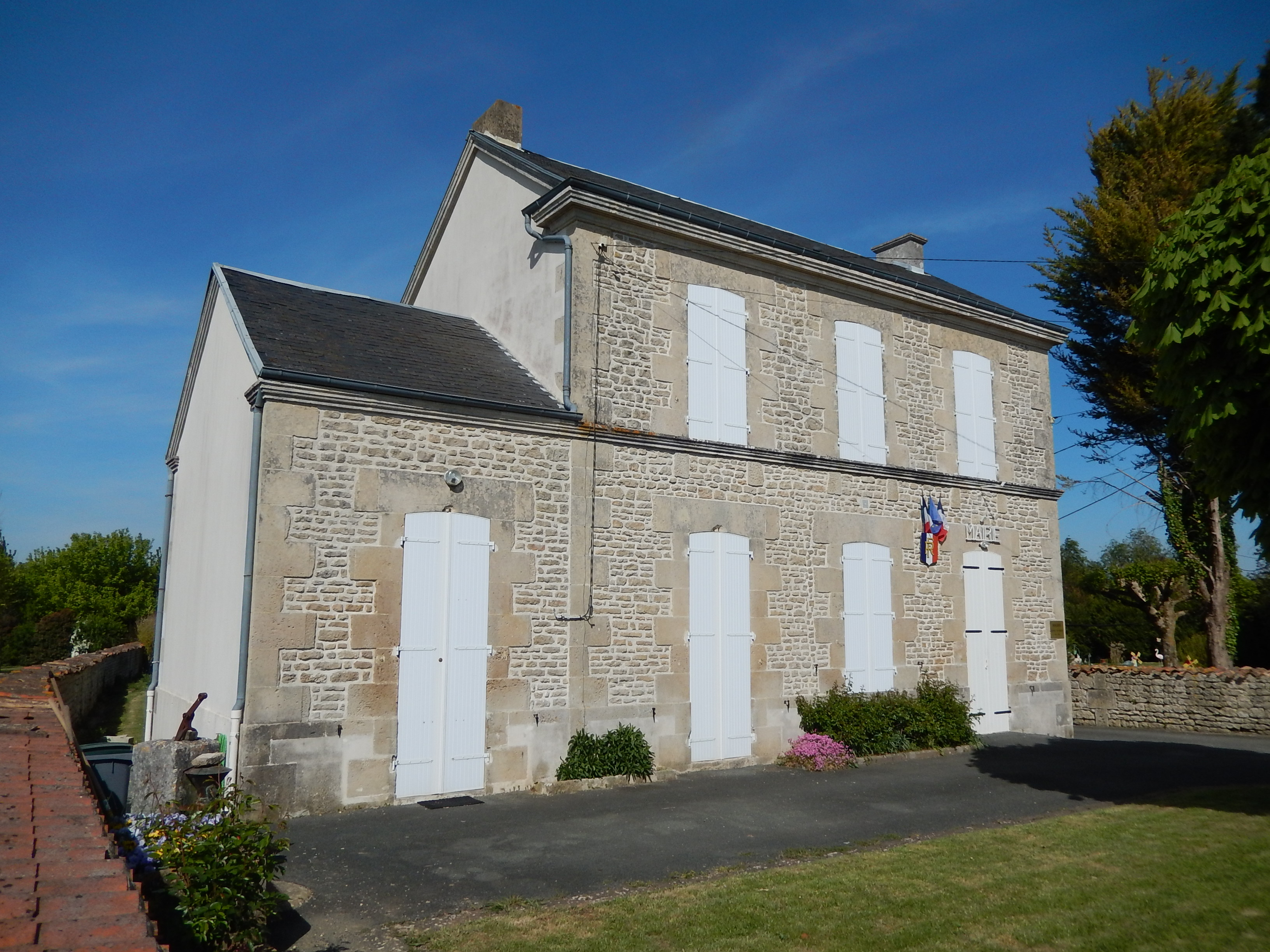
- The town hall in Saint-Martial
- Location of Saint-Martial
- Location within France Location within Nouvelle-Aquitaine
- Coordinates: 46°03′09″N 0°26′48″W
- Country: France
- Region: Nouvelle-Aquitaine
- Department: Charente-Maritime
- Arrondissement: Saint-Jean-d'Angély
- Canton: Matha

Government
  - Mayor (2020–2026): Francis Guay
- Area^{1}: 4.07 km^{2} (1.57 sq mi)
- Elevation: 48 m (157 ft)
- Highest elevation: 61 m (200 ft)
- Lowest elevation: 27 m (89 ft)
- Population (2023): 109
  - Density: 26.8/km^{2} (69.4/sq mi)
- Time zone: UTC+01:00 (CET)
  - Summer (DST): UTC+02:00 (CEST)
- INSEE/Postal code: 17361 /17330
- ^{1} French Land Register data, which excludes lakes, ponds, glaciers > 1 km^{2} (0.386 sq mi or 247 acres) and river estuaries.

Saint-Martial (French pronunciation: [sɛ̃ maʁsjal]) is a commune in the Charente-Maritime department in southwestern France.

== Geography ==
The commune is traversed by the river Boutonne.

== Population ==
Historical population
Year	Pop.	±% p.a.
1968	163	—
1975	138	−2.35%
1982	128	−1.07%
1990	112	−1.66%
1999	120	+0.77%
2007	121	+0.10%
2012	124	+0.49%
2017	116	−1.32%
2023	109	−1.03%
Source: INSEE

== See also ==
- Communes of the Charente-Maritime department
