= Saint-Séverin-sur-Boutonne =

- Commune
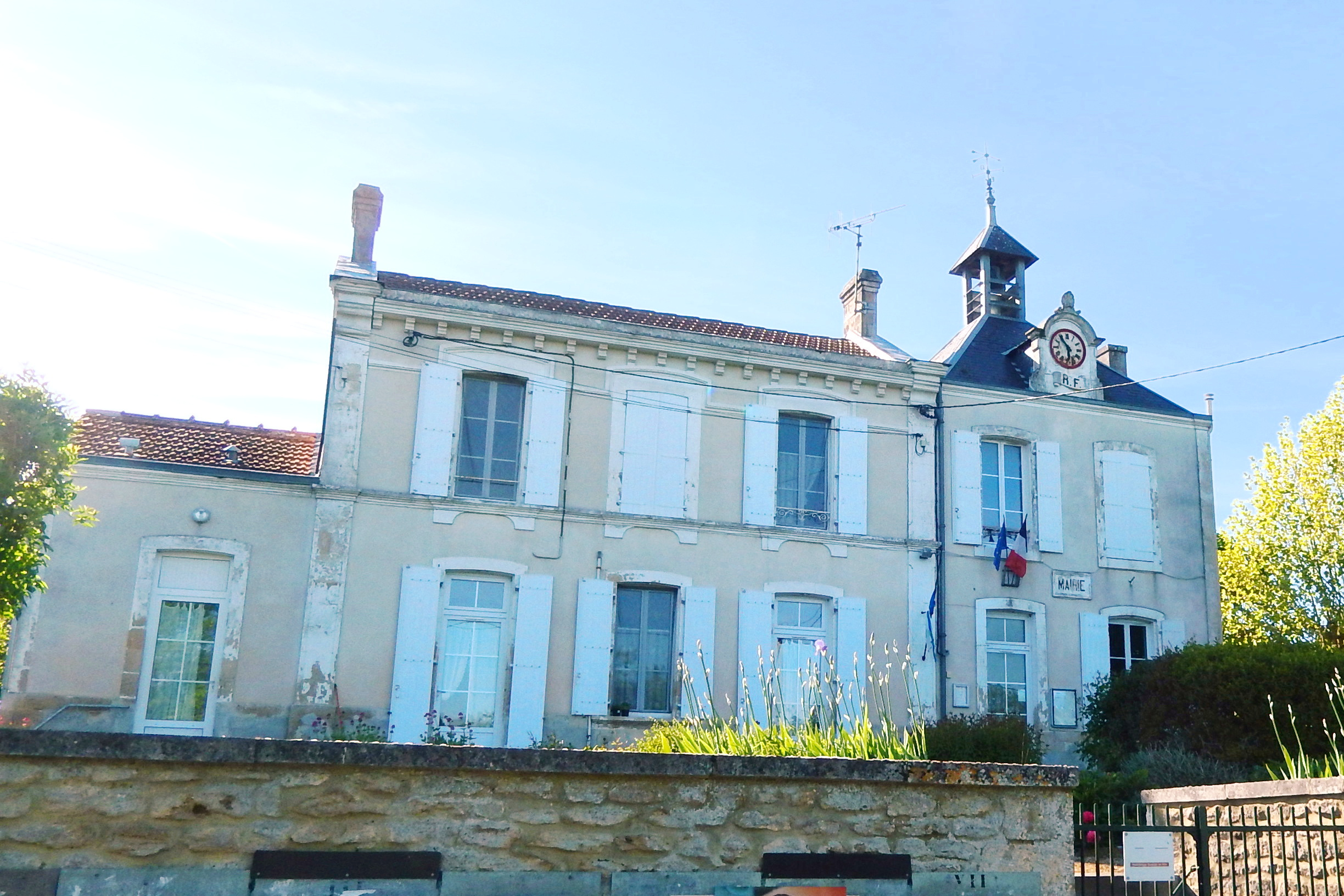
- The town hall in Saint-Séverin-sur-Boutonne
- Location of Saint-Séverin-sur-Boutonne
- Location within France Location within Nouvelle-Aquitaine
- Coordinates: 46°05′01″N 0°25′14″W
- Country: France
- Region: Nouvelle-Aquitaine
- Department: Charente-Maritime
- Arrondissement: Saint-Jean-d'Angély
- Canton: Matha

Government
  - Mayor (2020–2026): Jacques Goguet
- Area^{1}: 7.78 km^{2} (3.00 sq mi)
- Elevation: 50 m (160 ft)
- Highest elevation: 98 m (322 ft)
- Lowest elevation: 32 m (105 ft)
- Population (2023): 93
  - Density: 12/km^{2} (31/sq mi)
- Time zone: UTC+01:00 (CET)
  - Summer (DST): UTC+02:00 (CEST)
- INSEE/Postal code: 17401 /17330
- ^{1} French Land Register data, which excludes lakes, ponds, glaciers > 1 km^{2} (0.386 sq mi or 247 acres) and river estuaries.

Saint-Séverin-sur-Boutonne (French pronunciation: [sɛ̃ sevʁɛ̃ syʁ butɔn], literally Saint-Séverin on Boutonne) is a commune in the Charente-Maritime department in southwestern France.

== Geography ==
The village lies on the right bank of the Boutonne, which forms most of the commune's eastern border.

== Population ==
Historical population
Year	Pop.	±% p.a.
1968	188	—
1975	170	−1.43%
1982	156	−1.22%
1990	145	−0.91%
1999	136	−0.71%
2007	121	−1.45%
2012	111	−1.71%
2017	99	−2.26%
2023	93	−1.04%
Source: INSEE

== See also ==
- Communes of the Charente-Maritime department
