= Courcelles, Charente-Maritime =

Courcelles
- Commune
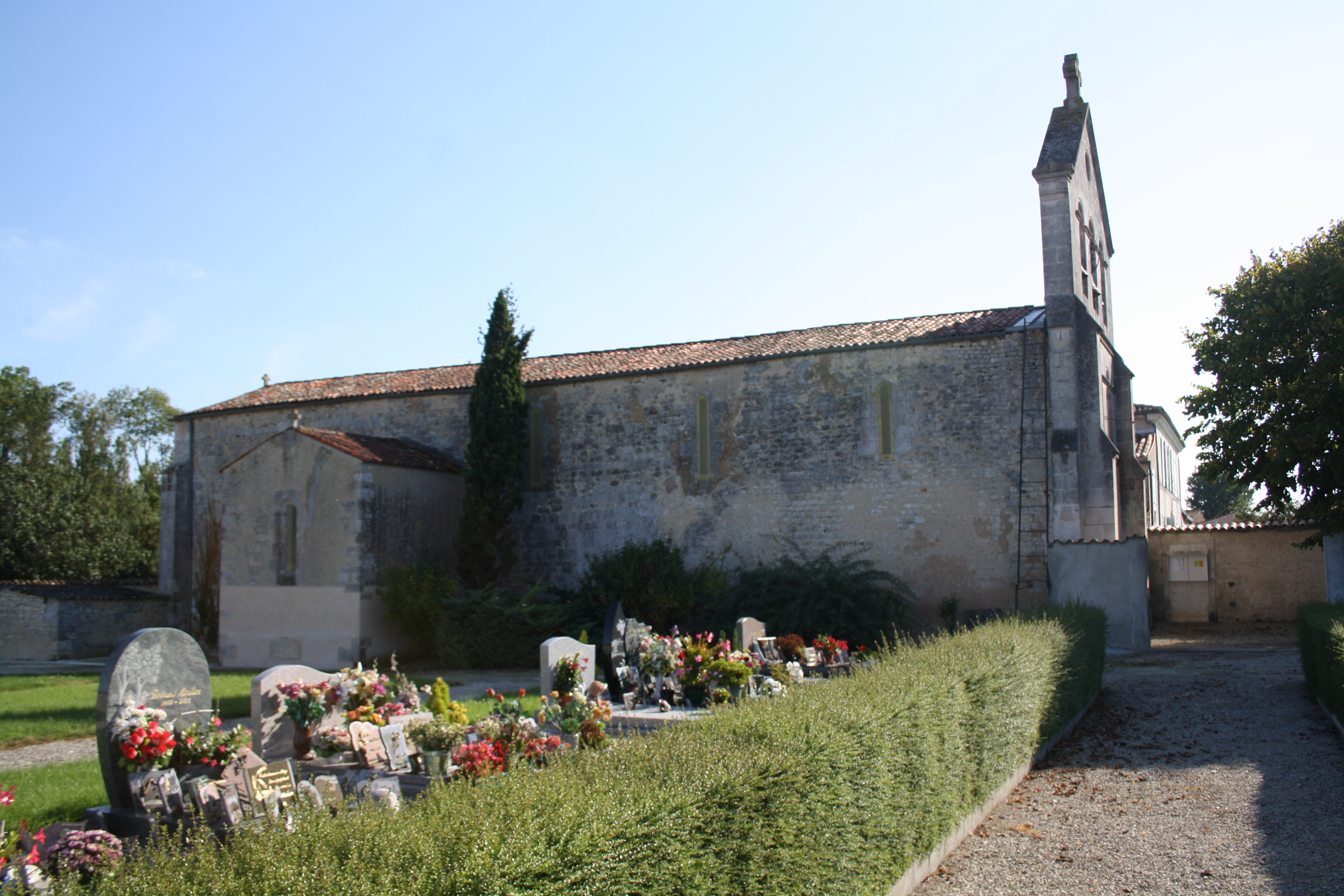
- The church in Courcelles
- Location of Courcelles
- Location within France Location within Nouvelle-Aquitaine
- Coordinates: 45°57′13″N 0°28′19″W
- Country: France
- Region: Nouvelle-Aquitaine
- Department: Charente-Maritime
- Arrondissement: Saint-Jean-d'Angély
- Canton: Matha
- Intercommunality: Vals de Saintonge

Government
  - Mayor (2020–2026): Philippe Harmegnies
- Area^{1}: 6.77 km^{2} (2.61 sq mi)
- Elevation: 20 m (66 ft)
- Highest elevation: 68 m (223 ft)
- Lowest elevation: 15 m (49 ft)
- Population (2023): 455
  - Density: 67.2/km^{2} (174/sq mi)
- Time zone: UTC+01:00 (CET)
  - Summer (DST): UTC+02:00 (CEST)
- INSEE/Postal code: 17125 /17400
- ^{1} French Land Register data, which excludes lakes, ponds, glaciers > 1 km^{2} (0.386 sq mi or 247 acres) and river estuaries.

Courcelles (French pronunciation: [kuʁsɛl]) is a commune in the southwestern French department of Charente-Maritime.

== Geography ==
The village lies on the right bank of the Boutonne, which forms most of the commune's eastern border.

== Population ==
Historical population
Year	Pop.	±% p.a.
1968	335	—
1975	354	+0.79%
1982	461	+3.84%
1990	494	+0.87%
1999	436	−1.38%
2007	435	−0.03%
2012	457	+0.99%
2017	471	+0.61%
2023	455	−0.57%
Source: INSEE

== See also ==
- Communes of the Charente-Maritime department
