= Boutonne =

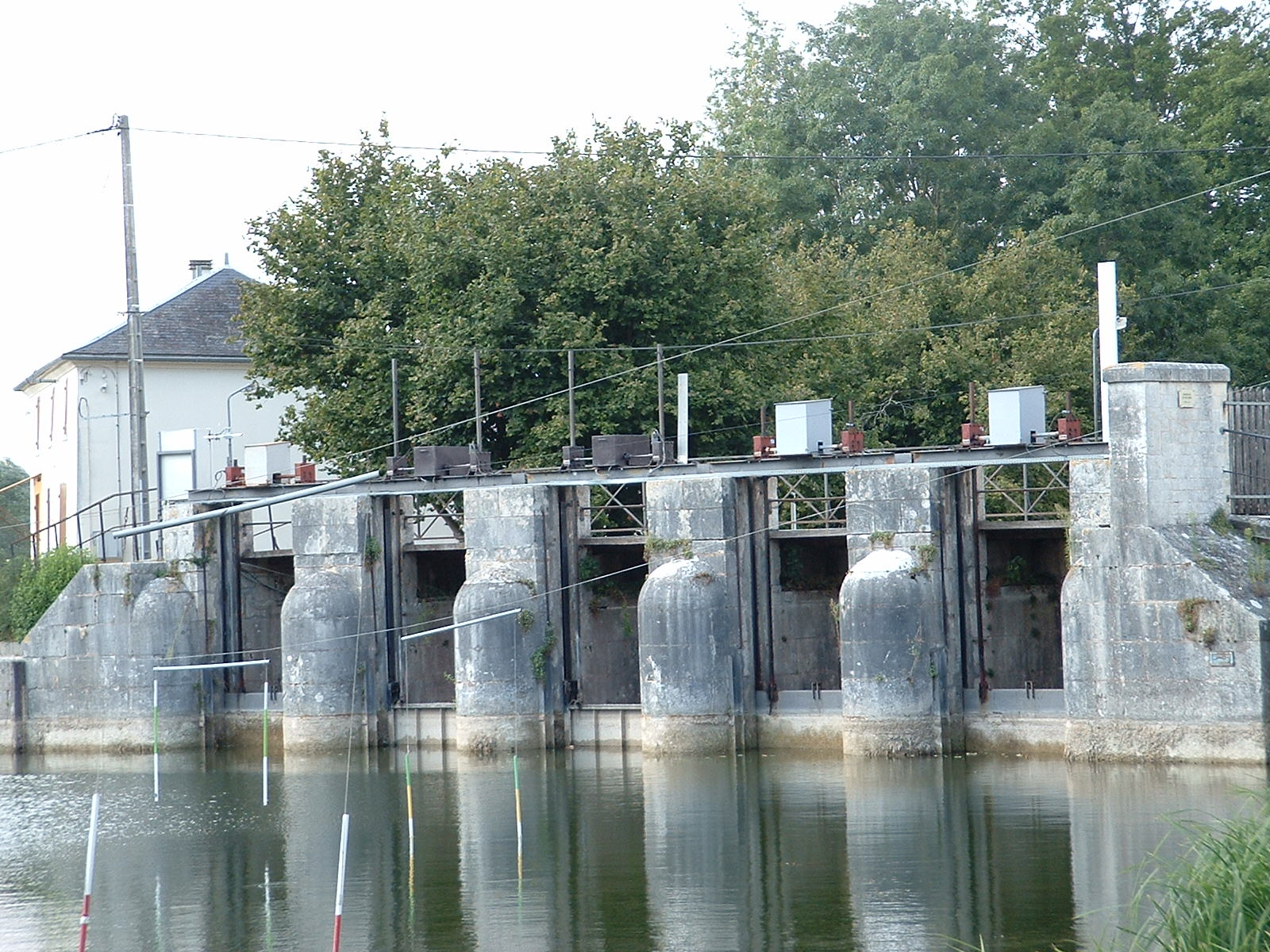
- The Boutonne at Saint-Jean-d'Angély

Location
- Country: France

Physical characteristics
- Source
  - location: Chef-Boutonne
  - coordinates: 46°06′46″N 00°03′57″W
  - elevation: 85 m (279 ft)
- Mouth
  - location: Charente
  - coordinates: 45°54′32″N 00°49′35″W
  - elevation: 4 m (13 ft)
- Length: 98.8 km (61.4 mi)
- Basin size: 1,320 km^{2} (510 sq mi)
- Discharge
  - average: 13 m^{3}/s (460 cu ft/s)

Basin features
- Progression: Charente→ Atlantic Ocean

The Boutonne (French pronunciation: [butɔn]) is a 98.8 km (61.4 mi) long river in the Deux-Sèvres and Charente-Maritime departments in western France. Its source is in the village of Chef-Boutonne (French: head of the Boutonne). It flows generally southwest. It is a right tributary of the Charente into which it flows near Cabariot.

== Departments and communes along its course ==
This list is ordered from source to mouth:

- Deux-Sèvres: Chef-Boutonne, Fontenille-Saint-Martin-d'Entraigues, Chérigné, Lusseray, Brioux-sur-Boutonne, Vernoux-sur-Boutonne, Séligné, Brieuil-sur-Chizé, Villefollet, Villiers-sur-Chizé, Chizé, Le Vert
- Charente-Maritime: Dampierre-sur-Boutonne, Saint-Séverin-sur-Boutonne, Coivert, Blanzay-sur-Boutonne, Saint-Georges-de-Longuepierre, Saint-Martial, Saint-Pierre-de-l'Isle, Nuaillé-sur-Boutonne, Saint-Pardoult, Les Églises-d'Argenteuil, Antezant-la-Chapelle, Vervant, Poursay-Garnaud, Courcelles, Saint-Julien-de-l'Escap, Saint-Jean-d'Angély, Ternant, La Vergne, Voissay, Torxé, Les Nouillers, Tonnay-Boutonne, Puy-du-Lac, Archingeay, Saint-Coutant-le-Grand, Champdolent, Lussant, Cabariot,
