= Ballans =

- Commune
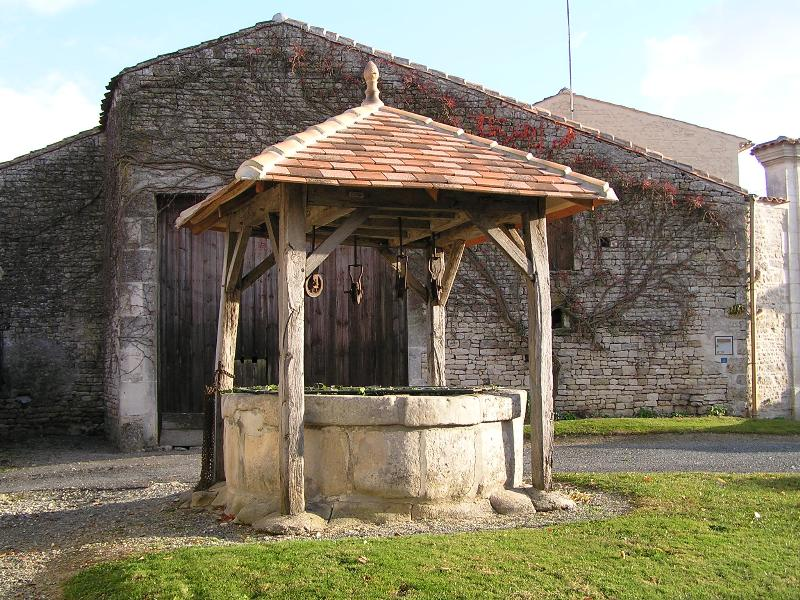
- An old Well in Ballans
- Location of Ballans
- Location within France Location within Nouvelle-Aquitaine
- Coordinates: 45°48′53″N 0°13′11″W
- Country: France
- Region: Nouvelle-Aquitaine
- Department: Charente-Maritime
- Arrondissement: Saint-Jean-d'Angély
- Canton: Matha

Government
  - Mayor (2020–2026): Marie-Agnès Begey
- Area^{1}: 6.94 km^{2} (2.68 sq mi)
- Elevation: 72 m (236 ft)
- Highest elevation: 82 m (269 ft)
- Lowest elevation: 24 m (79 ft)
- Population (2023): 201
  - Density: 29.0/km^{2} (75.0/sq mi)
- Time zone: UTC+01:00 (CET)
  - Summer (DST): UTC+02:00 (CEST)
- INSEE/Postal code: 17031 /17160
- ^{1} French Land Register data, which excludes lakes, ponds, glaciers > 1 km^{2} (0.386 sq mi or 247 acres) and river estuaries.

Ballans (French pronunciation: [balɑ̃]) is a commune in the department of Charente-Maritime, southwestern France.

== Geography ==
Ballans is located some 35 km (22 miles) north-west of Angoulême and 30 km (19 miles) east by north-east of Saintes. The southern border of the commune is the departmental border between Charente-Maritime and Charente. Access to the commune is by the D124 road from Brie-sous-Matha in the west which passes through the village and continues south-east to Macqueville. The D133 from Macqueville to Siecq forms part of the eastern border of the commune. Apart from the village there is the hamlet of Les Gorains south-east of the village. The commune is entirely farmland.

=== Geology and terrain ===
The commune is in a Jurassic limestone area which dates to the Tithonian (formerly called Portlandian) at the boundary of the Upper Jurassic and Lower Cretaceous (Berriasian stage) areas and there are marl and clay outcrops. This is a zone of low relief that is part of the drainage basin of the Charente river. Ballans commune is on a hill 82 m (269 feet) high which overlooks the lowlands of other communes (24 m/79 feet or lower).

=== Climate ===
The climate is oceanic Aquitaine.

== Toponymy ==
The name Ballans is of Celtic origin meaning "low land".

== History ==
It was in Ballans that Richard I of England fought against his father, King Henry II of England, on 4 July 1189 and became king two days later. With the help of King Philip, Richard defeated his father in Ballans and was then pronounced heir to the throne of England. Henry II retreated to Chinon where he died and Richard became King of England, Count of Anjou, and Duke of Normandy.

In 1417 Jean Godefroy was Lord of Ballans.

According to the State of Parishes in 1686 the Parish of Ballant had Louis Audouyn as Lord with 80 fires and land which produced grains and wine.

Baron de Livenne was Lord of Ballans in the 18th century. The botanist Bernard de Jussieu presented him with a cedar in 1734. By its girth and its majesty, it was greater than the cedar in the Jardin des Plantes in Paris which was planted by Bernard Jussieu in the same year. A third cedar from Lebanon brought with the first two trees was planted by Bernard de Jussieu on his Loiret property but it died after several years.

In 1789 Ballans participated in the drafting of the list of grievances which provides us valuable information:

"The parish of Ballans complains that ecclesiastical tithes are paid at Saintes college and what the priests take is not only for charitable works but even for their own needs. It requires mercy and the justice of your Majesty in this regard that the tithes be for the pastor in charge of maintaining the church and the rectory and to fill other functions and duties without perquisites and as tithes of this parish assigned to the College of Saintes, your Majesty is humbly begged to order that all ecclesiastical tithes and other benefits, to be raised annually an amount equivalent to that of the farm tithes of the said parish which currently amount to seventeen hundred and fifty livres."

In the 20th century the main activity was the raising and selling of horses.

== Administration ==
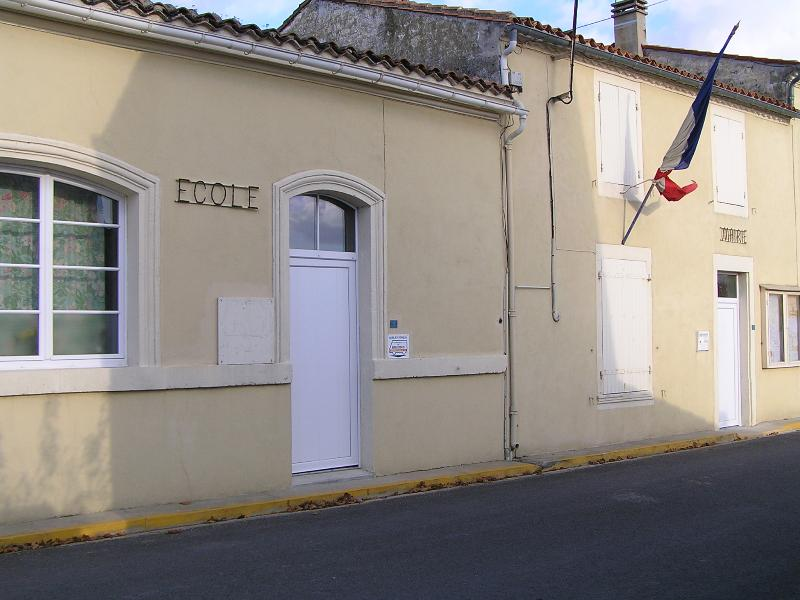
The Town Hall

List of Successive Mayors

From	To	Name
2001	2014	Annie Trimoulinard
2014	2026	Marie-Agnès Begey

=== Inter-communality ===
Ballans is part of the Community of communes of Vals de Saintonge Communauté which includes 110 communes, and has its seat in Saint-Jean-d'Angély.

=== Town planning ===
According to the census of 2010 there were 137 dwellings in the commune, of which 86 are principal homes, 23 secondary residences and 28 vacant. The principal homes are mostly old: 43 (50%) are from before 1919.

== Demography ==
The inhabitants of the commune are known as Ballansois or Ballansoises and Balançais or Balançaises in French.

Historical population

Year	Pop.	±% p.a.
1793	495	—
1821	554	+0.40%
1846	571	+0.12%
1872	565	−0.04%
1901	475	−0.60%
1926	327	−1.48%
1946	280	−0.77%
1962	280	+0.00%
1968	255	−1.55%

Year	Pop.	±% p.a.
1975	224	−1.83%
1982	225	+0.06%
1990	204	−1.22%
1999	218	+0.74%
2007	205	−0.77%
2012	217	+1.14%
2017	197	−1.92%
2023	201	+0.34%

Source: EHESS and INSEE

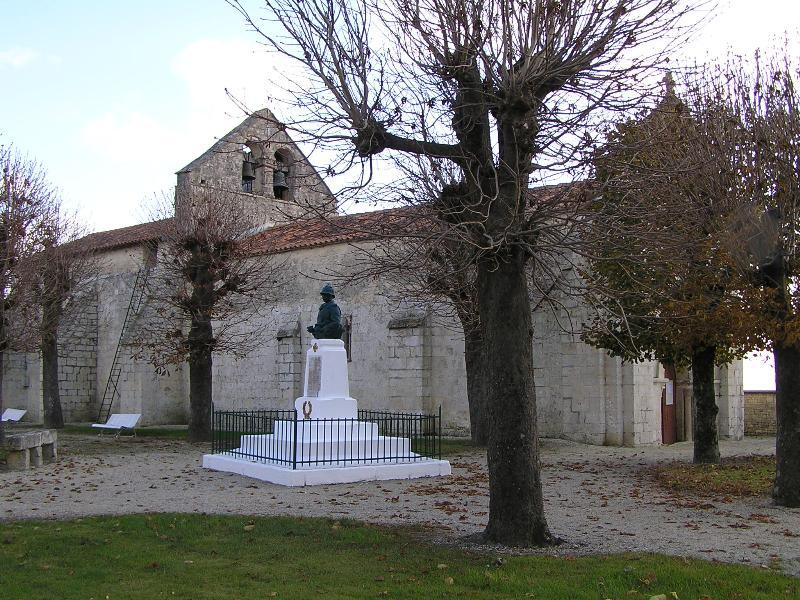
The War Memorial

== Economy and employment ==
According to the 2017 census there are 95 employable people of which 90 are active employees or self-employed. Most of them (74%) work outside the commune. The activity is totally related to viticulture in this Fins Bois area of the Cognac region.

The village has one rural multi-service shop with a bar and a post office.

== Facilities ==
=== Education ===
The school is an Inter-communal Educational Grouping (RPI) between Macqueville, Neuvicq, Siecq, and Ballans.

Ballans hosts one class which is a large children's section and CP.

=== Sports and recreation ===
There is a Hiking route and a Tennis court.

There is a local festival on the third weekend in June, Fireworks on 14 July, and a flea market in the schools on the 1st Sunday of October.

=== Associations ===
There is a Senior Citizens Club, the festival committee, and the ACCA hunting society.

== Sites and Monuments ==
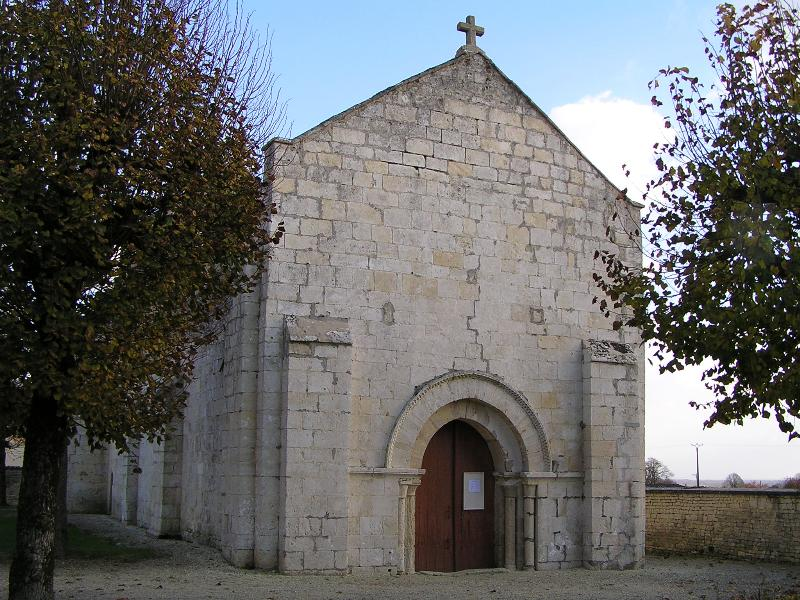
The Church of Saint-Jacques

- The Church of Saint-Jacques was rebuilt in the 15th century. The Choir and apse kept their broken arched vault and are separated by two small columns with capitals decorated with Gothic foliage.
- The rural heritage is represented by Charentais porches, fountains, one of which feeds a Lavoir (public laundry). There are old wells including one dating to the 17th century .
- A remarkable tree, a cedar from Lebanon was given to Baron de Livenne, Lord of Ballans, by the botanist Bernard de Jussieu in 1734. This cedar, despite being hit by lightning, dominates the village. It was planted at the same time as the Jardin des Plantes in Paris.

== See also ==
- Communes of the Charente-Maritime department
