= Castillon-sur-Agen =

Coordinates: 44°12′32″N 0°39′9″E

Castillon-sur-Agen was a medieval castle in the commune of Bon-Encontre, near Agen in Aquitaine, France.

Built on the top of a small hill with sheer rock cliffs (the plateau de Castillou), it was "fortified by both nature and artifice". According to the 12th-century chronicler Robert of Torigny, Henry II of England besieged Castillion-sur-Agen in 1161. After just one week the garrison capitulated. Roger of Howden recorded that nearly 15 years later, in 1175, the site was besieged by Prince Richard (later King Richard I of England), Henry II's son. On this occasion the siege lasted two months; it was part of a campaign of repressing rebellious barons after the Revolt of 1173–1174. It was Richard's first successful siege.

== See also ==
- List of castles in France
