= Macqueville =

- Commune
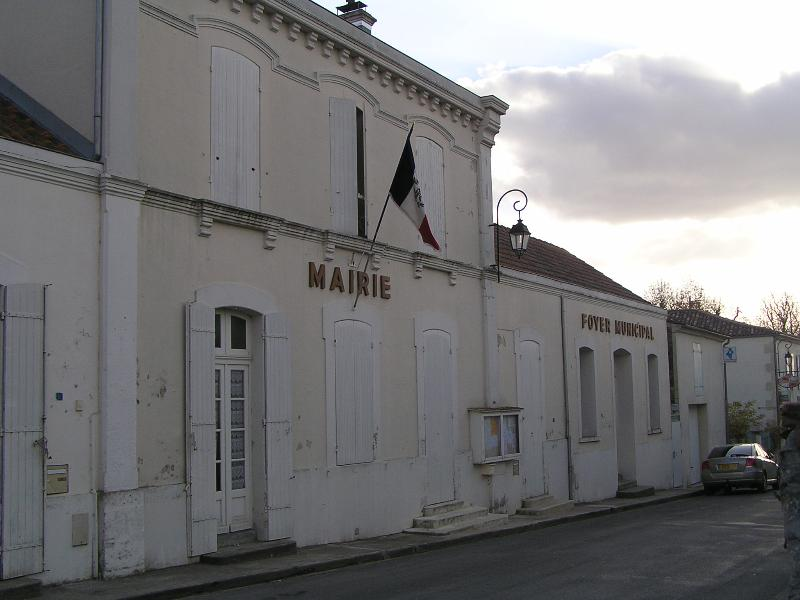
- Town hall
- Location of Macqueville
- Location within France Location within Nouvelle-Aquitaine
- Coordinates: 45°48′01″N 0°12′46″W
- Country: France
- Region: Nouvelle-Aquitaine
- Department: Charente-Maritime
- Arrondissement: Saint-Jean-d'Angély
- Canton: Matha

Government
  - Mayor (2020–2026): Christian Gratereau
- Area^{1}: 11.21 km^{2} (4.33 sq mi)
- Elevation: 50 m (160 ft)
- Highest elevation: 97 m (318 ft)
- Lowest elevation: 22 m (72 ft)
- Population (2023): 297
  - Density: 26.5/km^{2} (68.6/sq mi)
- Time zone: UTC+01:00 (CET)
  - Summer (DST): UTC+02:00 (CEST)
- INSEE/Postal code: 17217 /17490
- ^{1} French Land Register data, which excludes lakes, ponds, glaciers > 1 km^{2} (0.386 sq mi or 247 acres) and river estuaries.

Macqueville (French pronunciation: [makvil]) is a commune in the Charente-Maritime department in southwestern France.

== Population ==
Historical population
| Year | Pop. | ±% p.a. |
|---|---|---|
| 1968 | 421 | — |
| 1975 | 356 | −2.37% |
| 1982 | 305 | −2.18% |
| 1990 | 276 | −1.24% |
| 1999 | 294 | +0.70% |
| 2007 | 291 | −0.13% |
| 2012 | 302 | +0.74% |
| 2017 | 290 | −0.81% |
| 2023 | 297 | +0.40% |
Source: INSEE

== See also ==
- Communes of the Charente-Maritime department
