= Siecq =

- Commune
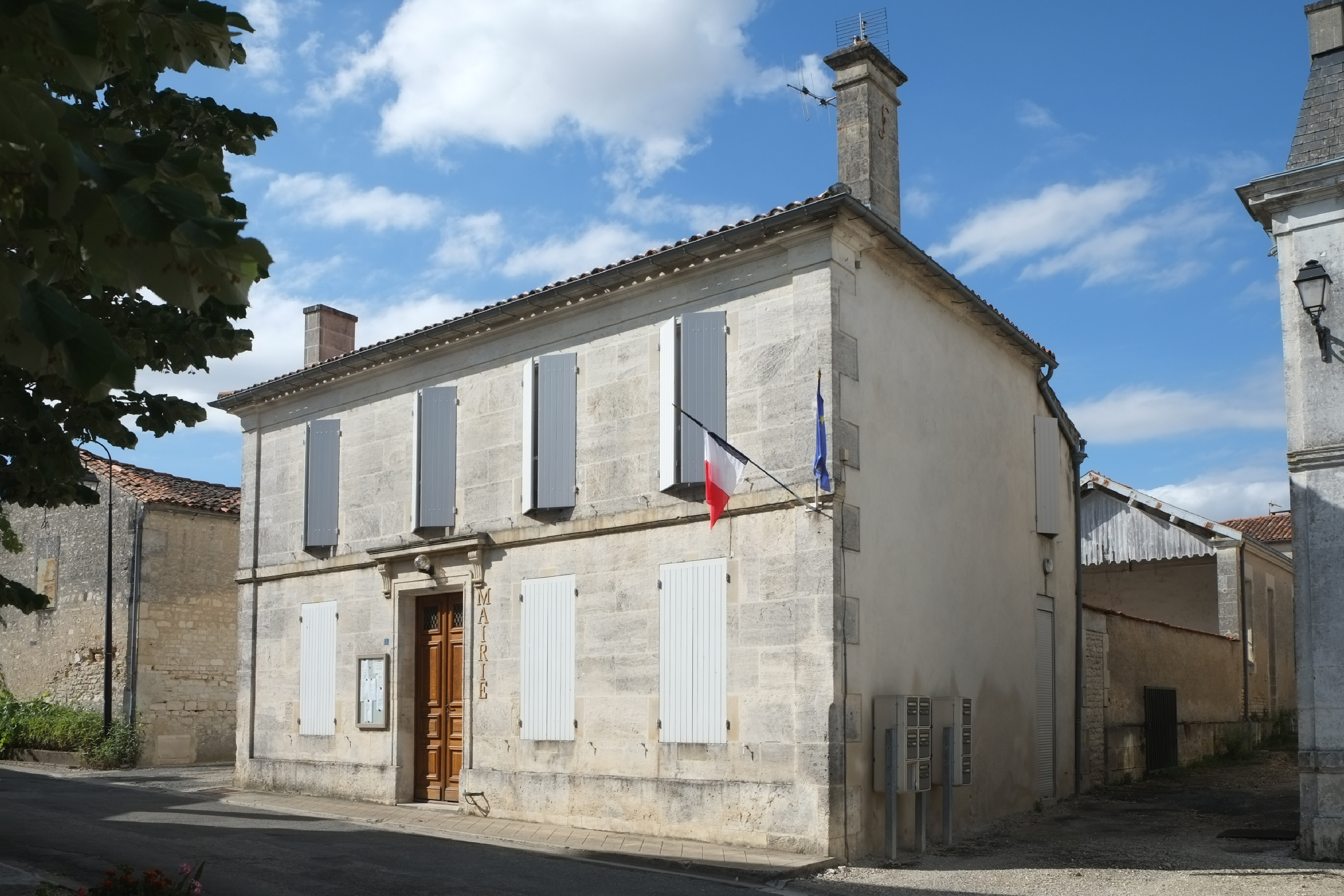
- The town hall in Siecq
- Location of Siecq
- Location within France Location within Nouvelle-Aquitaine
- Coordinates: 45°49′48″N 0°11′38″W
- Country: France
- Region: Nouvelle-Aquitaine
- Department: Charente-Maritime
- Arrondissement: Saint-Jean-d'Angély
- Canton: Matha

Government
  - Mayor (2020–2026): Suzanne Favreau
- Area^{1}: 11.66 km^{2} (4.50 sq mi)
- Elevation: 85 m (279 ft)
- Highest elevation: 116 m (381 ft)
- Lowest elevation: 66 m (217 ft)
- Population (2023): 211
  - Density: 18.1/km^{2} (46.9/sq mi)
- Time zone: UTC+01:00 (CET)
  - Summer (DST): UTC+02:00 (CEST)
- INSEE/Postal code: 17427 /17490
- ^{1} French Land Register data, which excludes lakes, ponds, glaciers > 1 km^{2} (0.386 sq mi or 247 acres) and river estuaries.

Siecq (French pronunciation: [sjɛk]) is a commune in the Charente-Maritime department in southwestern France.

== Population ==
Historical population
Year	Pop.	±% p.a.
1968	256	—
1975	268	+0.66%
1982	235	−1.86%
1990	215	−1.11%
1999	200	−0.80%
2007	206	+0.37%
2012	218	+1.14%
2017	215	−0.28%
2023	211	−0.31%
Source: INSEE

== See also ==
- Communes of the Charente-Maritime department
