= Granges-d'Ans =

- Commune
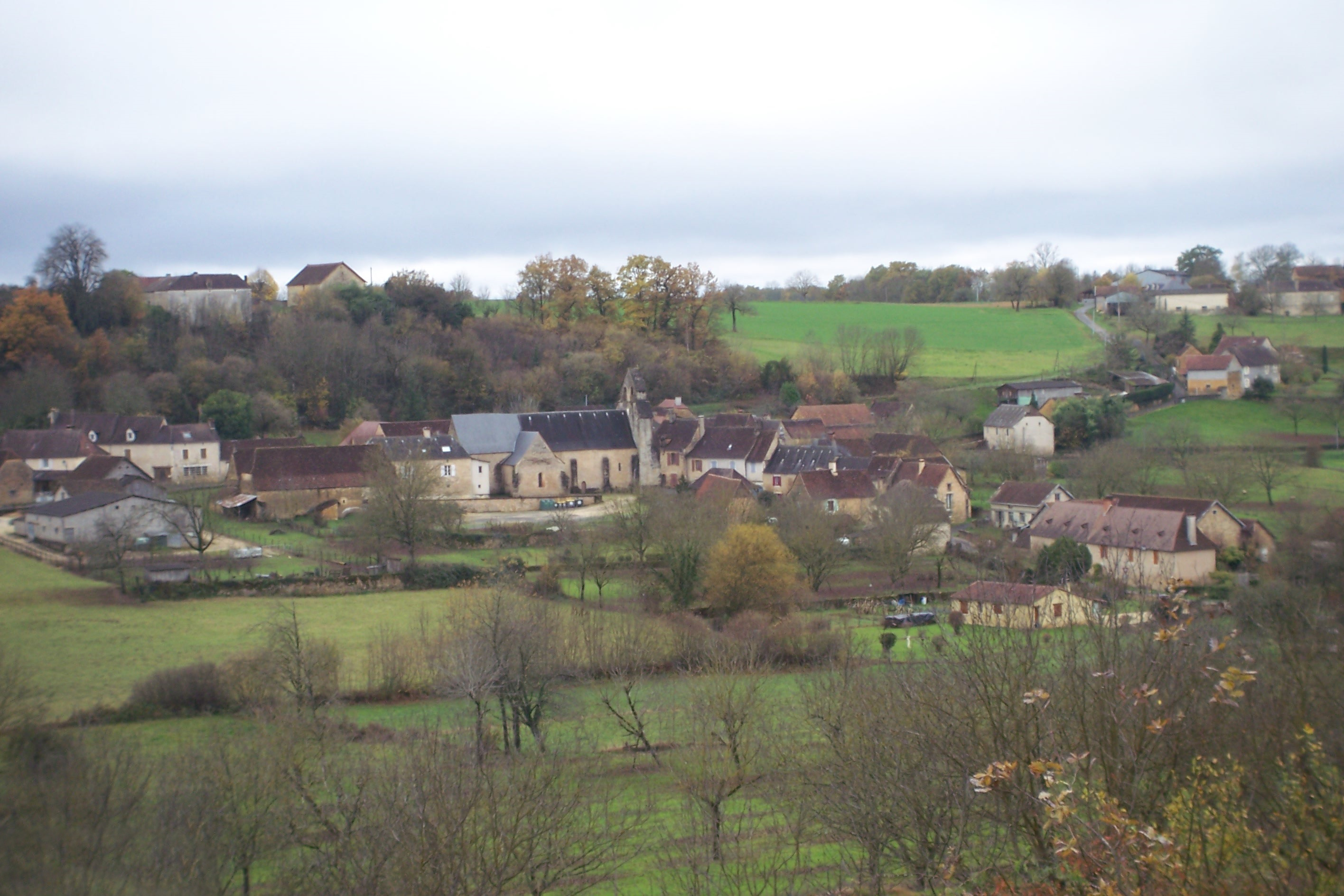
- A general view of Granges-d'Ans
- Location of Granges-d'Ans
- Location within France Location within Nouvelle-Aquitaine
- Coordinates: 45°12′45″N 1°07′09″E
- Country: France
- Region: Nouvelle-Aquitaine
- Department: Dordogne
- Arrondissement: Sarlat-la-Canéda
- Canton: Haut-Périgord Noir

Government
  - Mayor (2020–2026): Jacques Mignot
- Area^{1}: 11.81 km^{2} (4.56 sq mi)
- Elevation: 244 m (801 ft)
- Highest elevation: 338 m (1,109 ft)
- Lowest elevation: 198 m (650 ft)
- Population (2023): 150
  - Density: 13/km^{2} (33/sq mi)
- Time zone: UTC+01:00 (CET)
  - Summer (DST): UTC+02:00 (CEST)
- INSEE/Postal code: 24202 /24390
- ^{1} French Land Register data, which excludes lakes, ponds, glaciers > 1 km^{2} (0.386 sq mi or 247 acres) and river estuaries.

Granges-d'Ans (French pronunciation: [ɡʁɑ̃ʒ dɑ̃s]; Occitan: Granges d'Ans) is a commune in the Dordogne department in Nouvelle-Aquitaine in southwestern France. As part of the Pays d'Ans, it shares a link with the neighbouring communes of Badefols-d'Ans, La Boissière-d'Ans, Chourgnac d’Ans, Sainte-Eulalie-d'Ans and Saint-Pantaly-d'Ans.

== Twin town ==
Since 1999, the Granges d'Ans and its neighbouring communes in Pays d'Ans have been twinned with the Belgian town of Ans. It is reported that in the 14th century, the lord of Hautefort-en-Périgord, an overlord from all over the region, is said to have married one of his daughters to a Lord of Ans in Belgium (Prince-Bishopric of Liège at the time).

== Population ==
Historical population
Year	Pop.	±% p.a.
1968	314	—
1975	259	−2.71%
1982	227	−1.87%
1990	209	−1.03%
1999	208	−0.05%
2007	167	−2.71%
2012	167	+0.00%
2017	152	−1.86%
2023	150	−0.22%
Source: INSEE

The population of Granges-d'Ans has halved since the 1960s and is substantially lower than its historical peak of over 700 in the period 1840–1890. There is also a secondary population indicated by the housing statistics that show 33% of houses are secondary or vacation homes (53% are primary residences and 13% are vacant).

== Historical buildings ==
- Chateau de Redon: 14th century fortified house originally owned by Teyssières family and acquired by Georges Johnston in 1818.
- Église Saint-Martin: St Martins church is a 13th-century catholic church.

== River ==
- Soue
- The tributary of the Auvézère running through the Grotte de Tourtoirac rises in Loqueyssie in Granges d'Ans

== Famous people ==
- Georges Johnston (1773–1844), Landowner of Scottish extraction and Captain in Napoleonic army (aide de camp of General Andre Briche. Father of Georges de Peyrebrune
- Joseph Lachaud de Loqueyssie, French politician married in Granges d'Ans and became owner of Château de Redon

== Public transport ==
The nearest train stations are Gare de La Bachellerie (9 km) and Gare de Thenon (10 km). The TER Nouvelle-Aquitaine services of SNCF connect directly with Bordeaux and Brive.

A bus service from Perigueux operated by Transperigord serves Hautefort.

Adjacent to the La Bachellerie junction of the A89 autoroute is an area for carpooling ("Aire de covoiturage Chasselines")

The INSEE statistics report that none of the working population utilise public transport for work (74% use car or other vehicle and 26% report no transport or foot).

== See also ==
- Communes of the Dordogne department
