= Lachaud =

Lachaud is a French surname. Notable people with the surname include:

- Bastien Lachaud (born 1980), French politician representing la France Insoumise
- Joseph Lachaud de Loqueyssie (1848–1896), deputy of Tarn-et-Garonne
- Yvan Lachaud (born 1954), member of the National Assembly of France
