= List of protected heritage sites in Ans =

This table shows an overview of the protected heritage sites in the Walloon town Ans. This list is part of Belgium's national heritage.

Object	Year/architect	Town/section	Address	Coordinates	Number^{?}	Image
Hombroux farm ^{(nl)} ^{(fr)}		Ans		50.676058°N 5.520552°E	62003-CLT-0002-01 Info	De boerderij van Hombroux en ensemble van de boerderij met de omliggende terreinen
Hombroux farm (extension) ^{(nl)} ^{(fr)}		Ans		50.675815°N 5.521590°E	62003-CLT-0003-01 Info	Uitbreiding van de site van de boerderij van Hombroux geclassificeerd per koninklijk decreet van 19 juni 1978
Hombroux farm (2nd extension) ^{(nl)} ^{(fr)}		Ans		50.676326°N 5.520692°E	62003-CLT-0004-01 Info	Tweede uitbreiding van de classificatie van de site van boerderij van Hombroux en omgeving
Waroux Castle ^{(nl)} ^{(fr)}		Ans		50.682238°N 5.492915°E	62003-CLT-0005-01 Info	De totaliteit van het kasteel van Waroux, waaronder de gevels en daken van de boerderij, de site van het kasteel en de omliggende terreinen
"Cense dite de Monfort" farm ^{(nl)} ^{(fr)}		Ans	rue de l'Yser 200	50.659429°N 5.523429°E	62003-CLT-0007-01 Info	
Tumulus de Xhendremael ^{(nl)} ^{(fr)}		Ans		50.697360°N 5.478080°E	62003-CLT-0008-01 Info	Tumulus van Xhendremael en het terrein dat de tumulus omringd
Fort de Loncin ^{(nl)} ^{(fr)}		Ans	rue des Héros 17	50.674359°N 5.490874°E	62003-CLT-0009-01 Info	Fort van Loncin
"Li Tombe di Hên'mâl" archeological site ^{(nl)} ^{(fr)}		Ans		50.697360°N 5.478080°E	62003-PEX-0001-01 Info	Tumulus van Xhendremael, archeologische site met de naam "Li Tombe di Hên'mâl"

== See also ==
- List of protected heritage sites in Liège (province)
