= Adrien Joseph Prax-Paris =

French politician

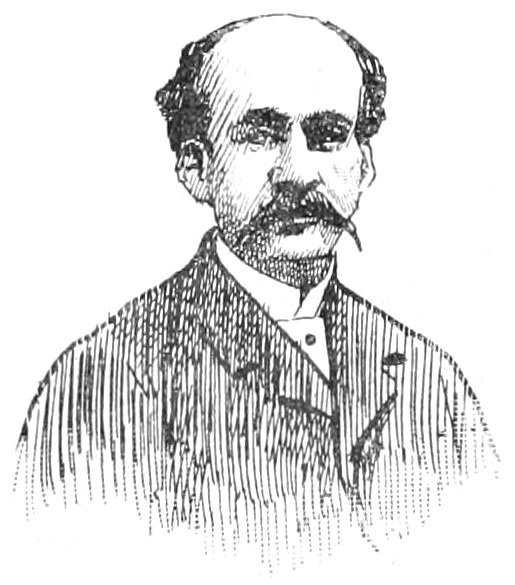
- Prax-Paris from Le Monde moderne, December 1898, by Maurice Dulac

Deputy of Tarn-et-Garonne
- In office 23 May 1869 – 4 September 1870

Representative of Tarn-et-Garonne
- In office 8 February 1871 – 7 March 1876

Deputy of Tarn-et-Garonne
- In office 20 February 1876 – 31 May 1902

Personal details
- Born: 2 October 1829 Montauban, Tarn-et-Garonne, France
- Died: 22 September 1909 (aged 79) Caussade, Tarn-et-Garonne, France
- Occupation: Politician

Adrien Joseph Prax-Paris (2 October 1829 – 22 September 1909) was a French politician who was a Bonapartist deputy for Tarn-et-Garonne during the Second French Empire and the French Third Republic.

== Early years (1829–70) ==
Adrien Joseph Prax-Paris was born on 2 October 1829 in Montauban, Tarn-et-Garonne. He was the son of a wealthy merchant, took an early interest in political economics, and supported the imperial regime. He a member for the Caussade canton in the Tarn-et-Garonne General Council from 1858. He was appointed Mayor of Montauban in 1860 and held this office until the end of the Second Empire. He was made a Knight of the Legion of Honour on 11 August 1864.

Prax-Paris ran for election to the legislature as the official candidate in the first district of Tarn-et-Garonne on 24 May 1869. He was easily elected, and sat with the dynastic majority. He voted in favour of the declaration of war with Prussia, leading to the Franco-Prussian War. He left office on 4 September 1870 when the French Third Republic was declared.

== Third Republic (1870–1909 ==
In 1871 Prax-Paris ran for election in the National Assembly. He was strongly opposed by the prefect of Tarn-et-Garonne, who had his posters torn down and confiscated his professions of faith and his ballots in the post office. However, he was elected as the second of four candidates on 8 February 1871 as representative of Tarn-et-Garonne. He joined the Bonapartist Appel au peuple parliamentary group, and was strongly opposed to Adolphe Thiers. He voted for peace with Germany, for public prayers, against the return of the government to Paris, for the fall of Thiers on 24 May, against the government of Albert de Broglie and against all the constitutional laws. The led a motion of censure that caused the resignation of the Minister of the Interior Victor Lefranc. When Napoleon III died he sent Napoléon, Prince Imperial, a letter in which he said "France loves you, hopes and waits." He held office until 7 March 1876.

In 1876 Prax-Paris ran for election for the Chamber of Deputies in both the first and second constituencies of Montauban on the Appel au peuple platform. He was elected in the second round of voting on 5 March 1876. His running mate was his nephew, Joseph Lachaud de Loqueyssie, who was defeated. He sat with the conservative and Bonapartist minority. He was the official candidate in the 14 October 1877 elections and won easily against the Republican candidate. Jean-Charles Abbatucci of the Appel au peuple group was narrowly defeated in the 20 February 1876 elections in Corsica. After the House was dissolved in 1877 Abbatucci was the government's candidate in the election of 14 October 1877 and easily won against the same opponent. There were several protests but Prax-Paris reported that the election was valid on 20 March 1879.

Prax-Paris was reelected on 21 August 1881. In the elections of 4 October 1885 Prax-Paris was listed at the top of the monarchist list in Tarn-et-Garonne, and was elected after a bitter struggle. The election was invalidated but Prax-Paris was reelected on 4 December 1885. He associated himself with the imperialist minority against the republican government. He voted for indefinite postponement of revision of the constitution, against prosecuting three members of the Ligue des Patriotes, against the draft Lisbonne law restricting freedom of the press and against the prosecution of General Boulanger.

Prax-Paris ran for election for first constituency of Montauban in 1889. He was reelected on 22 September 1889, and sat with the Union des Droites group. With the decline of Boulangism he was less active in the House. He left the General Council of Tarn-et-Garonne in 1892. He was reelected on 20 August 1893, sitting with the Ralliés group. This election took place after the two constituencies of Montauban had been merged. He was among the deputies who supported the ministry of Jules Méline for two years. Prax-Paris was reelected in the first round in 1898 after campaigning against the separation of Church and State and against the progressive income tax. He ran once more in 1902 but was defeated in the second round.

Prax-Paris left office on 31 May 1902. He retired to his Château de Treilhou near Caussade, Tarn-et-Garonne, where he died on 22 September 1909.

== Publications ==
Adrien Prax-Paris made various speeches, reports and proposals in the Chamber. His publications include:

- Adrien Prax-Paris (1860), Projets de travaux publics et d'emprunt proposés au conseil municipal de Montauban, Montauban: impr. de Forestié neveu, p. 25
- Adrien Prax-Paris (1864), Extinction de la mendicité, 1862-63, résumé des opérations (Rapport présenté par M. le maire), Montauban: impr. de Forestié neveu, p. 12
- Adrien Prax-Paris (20 January 1869), "Corps législatif ... Dénonciation du traité de commerce.", Journal Officiel: 23
- Adrien Prax-Paris (1873), "L'Appel au peuple devant l'Assemblée nationale", Journal Officiel (Discours): 34
- Adrien Prax-Paris (1874), Assemblée nationale. Séance du 15 janvier 1874. Loi sur la nomination des maires (Discours), Paris: impr. de Pougin, p. 24
- Adrien Prax-Paris (1876), La situation des partis en face des élections (lettre à M. Fernand Boudeville), Montauban

== Sources ==
- Adrien, Joseph Prax-Paris (in French), Assemblée nationale
- Adrien Prax-Paris (1829-1909) - Auteur du texte (in French), BnF: Bibliotheque nationale de France
- Jolly, Jean (1960–1977), "ABBATUCCI, JEAN, CHARLES", Dictionnaire des parlementaires français de 1889 à 1940 (in French), Paris: Éditeur : Presses universitaires de France, ISBN 978-2-1100-1998-1
- Robert, Adolphe; Cougny, Gaston (1889–1891), "PRAX-PARIS (ADRIEN-JOSEPH)", in Edgar Bourloton (ed.), Dictionnaire des Parlementaires français (1789–1889) (in French)
- Robert, Adolphe; Cougny, Gaston (1889–1891b), "ABBATUCCI (JEAN-CHARLES)", in Edgar Bourloton (ed.), Dictionnaire des Parlementaires français (1789–1889) (in French)
- Robert, Adolphe; Cougny, Gaston (1889–1891c), "LACHAUD DE LOQUEYSSIE(JOSEPH ALBERT DE)", in Edgar Bourloton (ed.), Dictionnaire des Parlementaires français (1789–1889) (in French)
