= Cubjac =

Commune in Dordogne, France

- Part of Cubjac-Auvézère-Val d'Ans
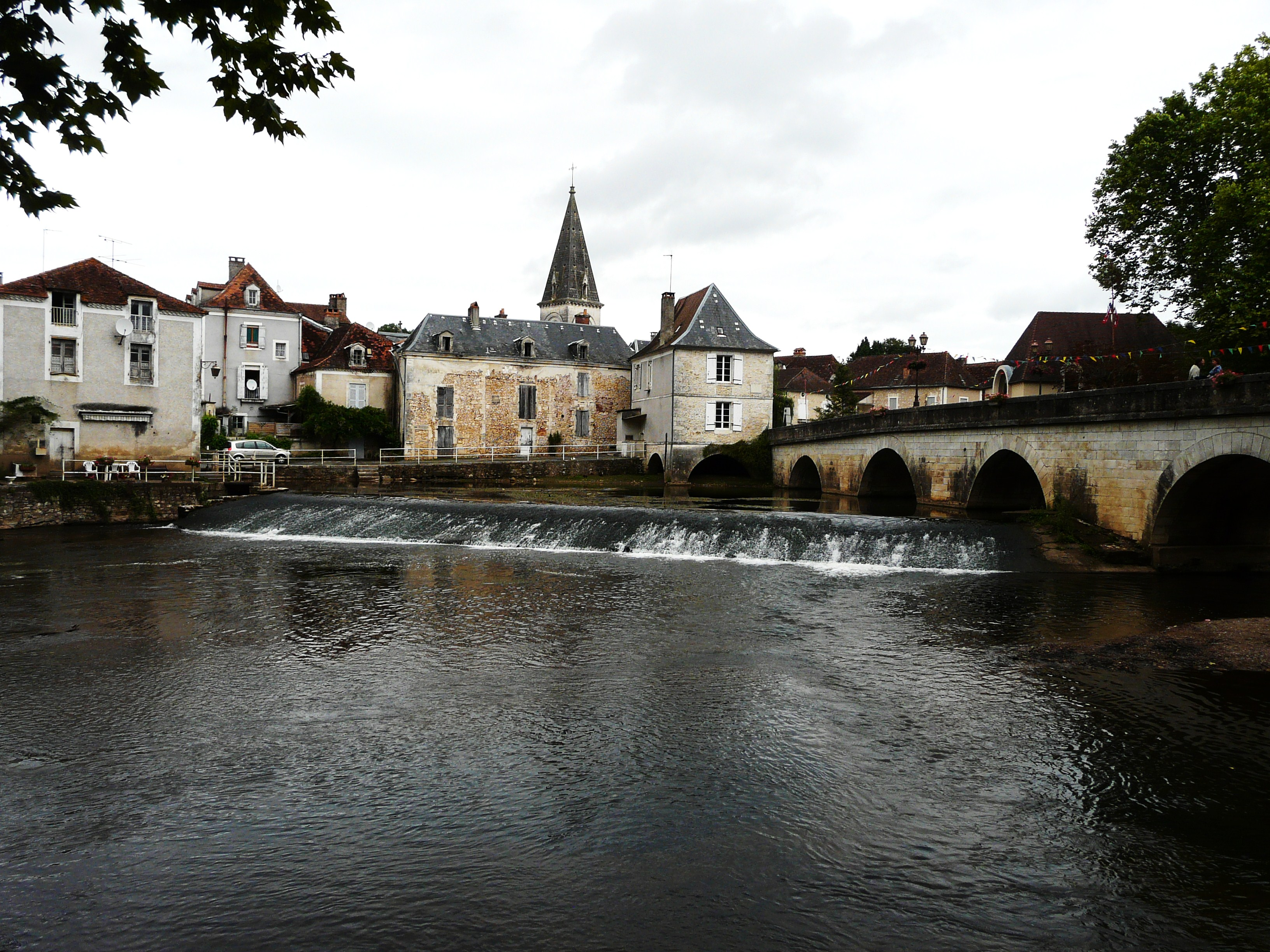
- Auvézère river
- Location of Cubjac
- Location within France Location within Nouvelle-Aquitaine
- Coordinates: 45°13′25″N 0°56′24″E
- Country: France
- Region: Nouvelle-Aquitaine
- Department: Dordogne
- Arrondissement: Périgueux
- Canton: Isle-Loue-Auvézère
- Commune: Cubjac-Auvézère-Val d'Ans
- Area^{1}: 20.62 km^{2} (7.96 sq mi)
- Elevation: 140 m (460 ft)
- Highest elevation: 253 m (830 ft)
- Lowest elevation: 107 m (351 ft)
- Population (2023): 731
  - Density: 35.5/km^{2} (91.8/sq mi)
- Time zone: UTC+01:00 (CET)
  - Summer (DST): UTC+02:00 (CEST)
- Postal code: 24640
- ^{1} French Land Register data, which excludes lakes, ponds, glaciers > 1 km^{2} (0.386 sq mi or 247 acres) and river estuaries.

Cubjac (French pronunciation: [kybʒak]; Occitan: Cujac) is a former commune in the Dordogne department in Nouvelle-Aquitaine in southwestern France. On 1 January 2017, it was merged into the new commune Cubjac-Auvézère-Val d'Ans.

== See also ==
- Communes of the Dordogne department
