= Waroux Castle =

Castle in Liège Province, Belgium

- Château de Waroux (French)
- Ans, Liège Province, Wallonia, Belgium
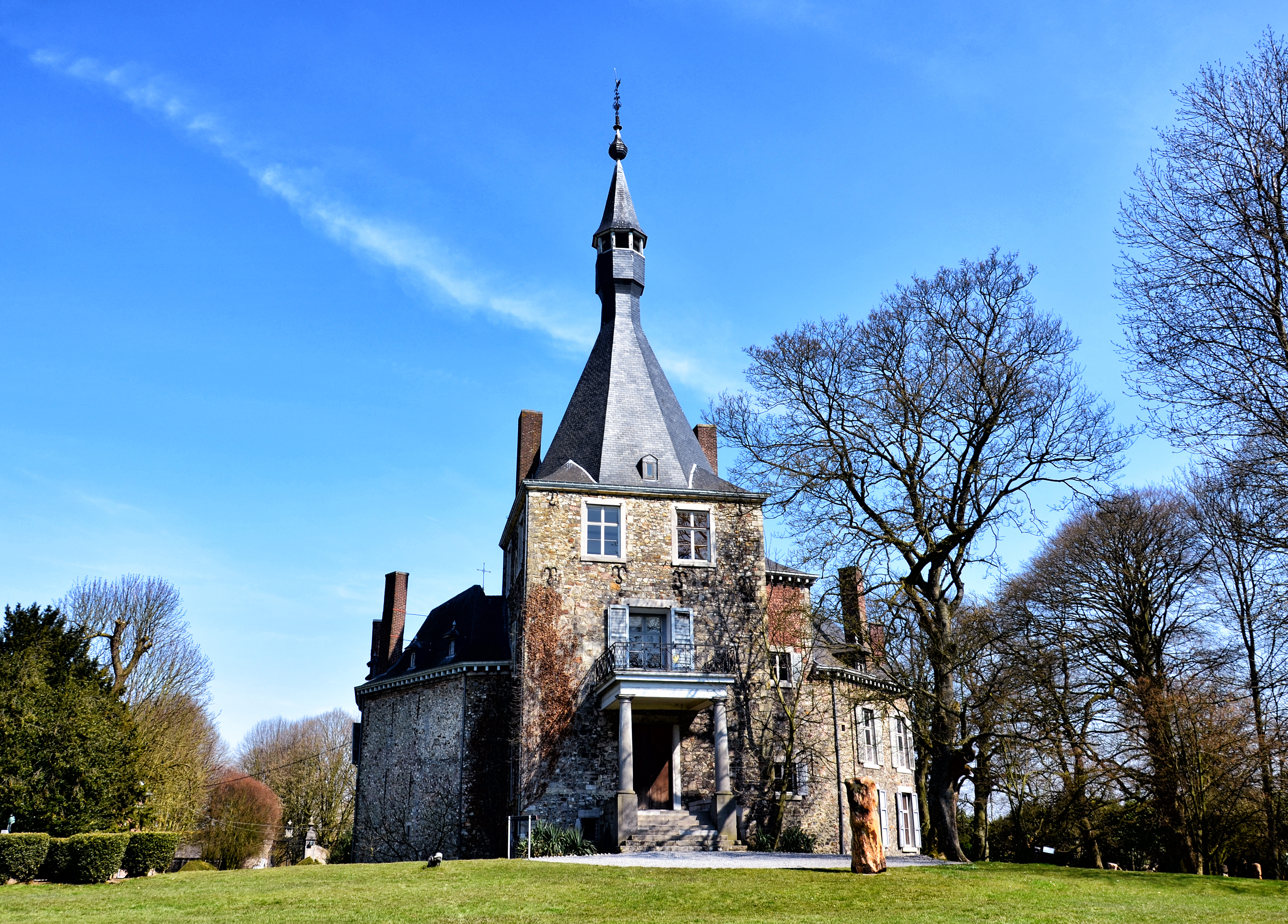

Site information
- Type: Castle
- Owner: Ans municipality

Location
- Coordinates: 50°40′56″N 5°29′34″E

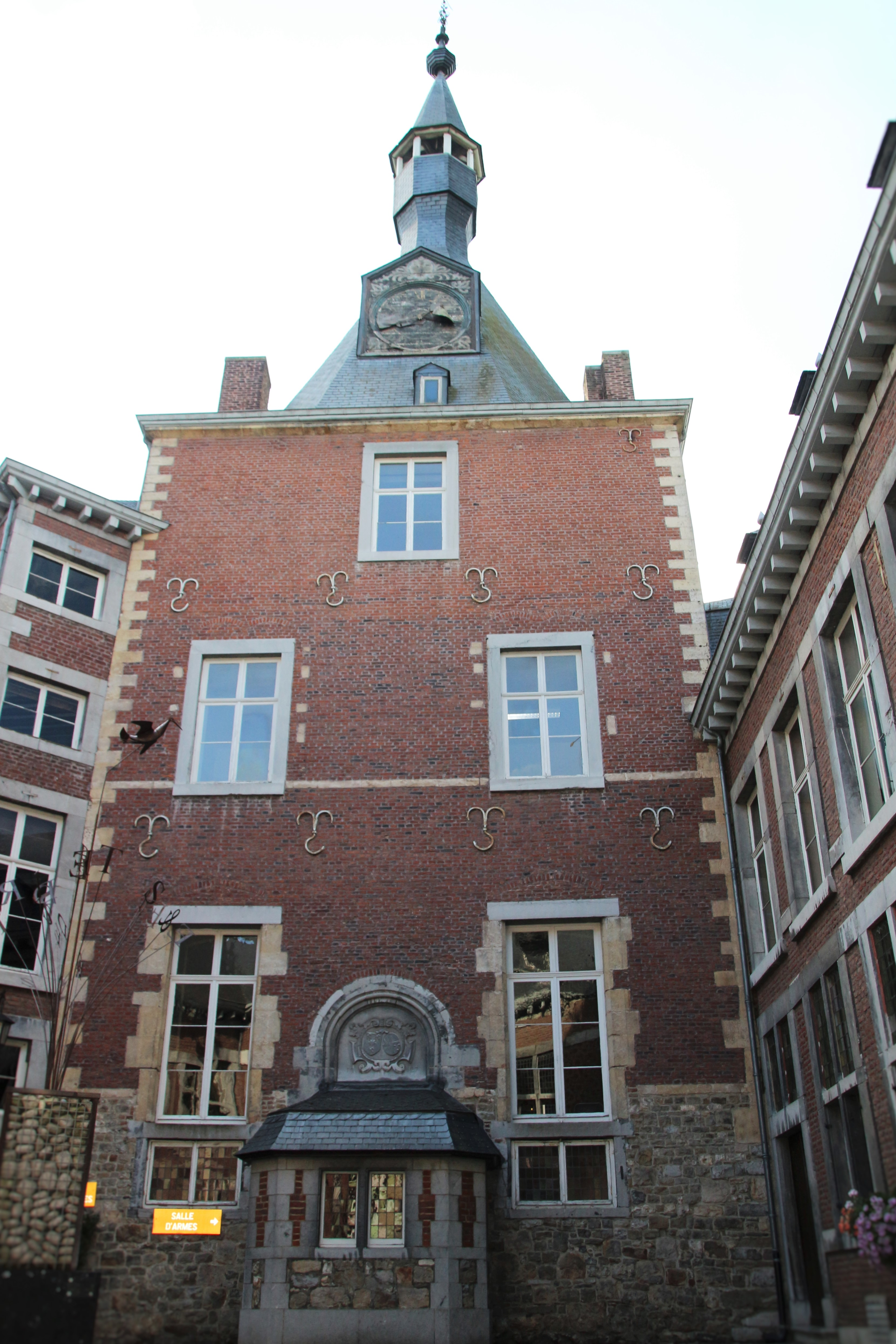
Bailey inside the circular walls of Waroux Castle

Waroux Castle (French: Château de Waroux) is a castle in Belgium, located in the old region of Hesbaye, in the ancienne commune of Alleur, Ans, Liège Province, Wallonia.

Waroux was one of the rare circular castles in Belgium. The keep still remains of the medieval structure. For centuries it was the property of the de Waroux family until 1525, when it died by marriage. In 1696, it was apparently acquired by the De Clerkx de Waroux family, who remained the owners until 1925. The castle became the property of the commune of Ans in 2005.

== See also ==
- List of castles in Belgium
