= Montauban =

Administrative division in Occitania, France

Montauban Montalban (Occitan)
- Prefecture and commune
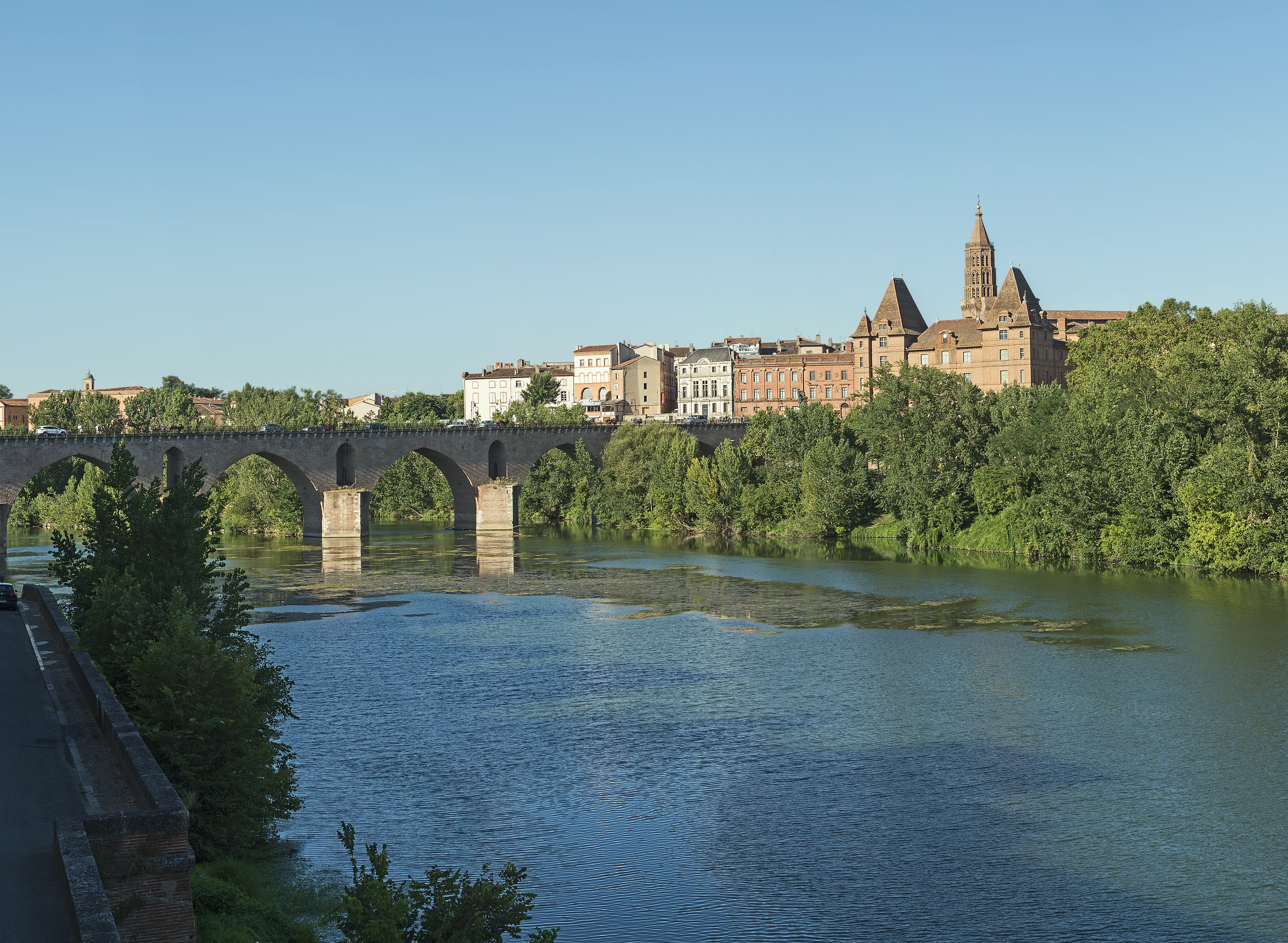
- Old Bridge and the Ingres Museum

- Coat of arms
- Location of Montauban
- Location within France Location within Occitanie
- Coordinates: 44°01′05″N 1°21′21″E
- Country: France
- Region: Occitania
- Department: Tarn-et-Garonne
- Arrondissement: Montauban
- Canton: Montauban-1, 2 and 3
- Intercommunality: CA Grand Montauban

Government
  - Mayor (2024–2026): Marie-Claude Berly (LR)
- Area^{1}: 135.17 km^{2} (52.19 sq mi)
- Elevation: 87 m (285 ft)
- Highest elevation: 207 m (679 ft)
- Lowest elevation: 72 m (236 ft)
- Population (2023): 62,945
  - Density: 465.67/km^{2} (1,206.1/sq mi)
- Time zone: UTC+01:00 (CET)
  - Summer (DST): UTC+02:00 (CEST)
- INSEE/Postal code: 82121 /82000
- Website: montauban.com
- ^{1} French Land Register data, which excludes lakes, ponds, glaciers > 1 km^{2} (0.386 sq mi or 247 acres) and river estuaries.

Montauban (US: /ˌmɒntoʊˈbɒn, ˌmoʊntoʊˈbɒ̃/, French: [mɔ̃tobɑ̃]; Occitan: Montalban [muntalˈβa]) is a commune in the southern French department of Tarn-et-Garonne. It is the capital of the department and lies 50 kilometres (31 mi) north of Toulouse. Montauban is the most populated town in Tarn-et-Garonne, and the sixth most populated in Occitanie behind Toulouse, Montpellier, Nîmes, Perpignan and Béziers. In 2023, there were 62,945 inhabitants, called Montalbanais in French. The town has been classified in the French Towns and Lands of Art and History network since 2015.

The town, built mainly of reddish brick, stands on the right bank of the Tarn at its confluence with the Tescou.

== History ==
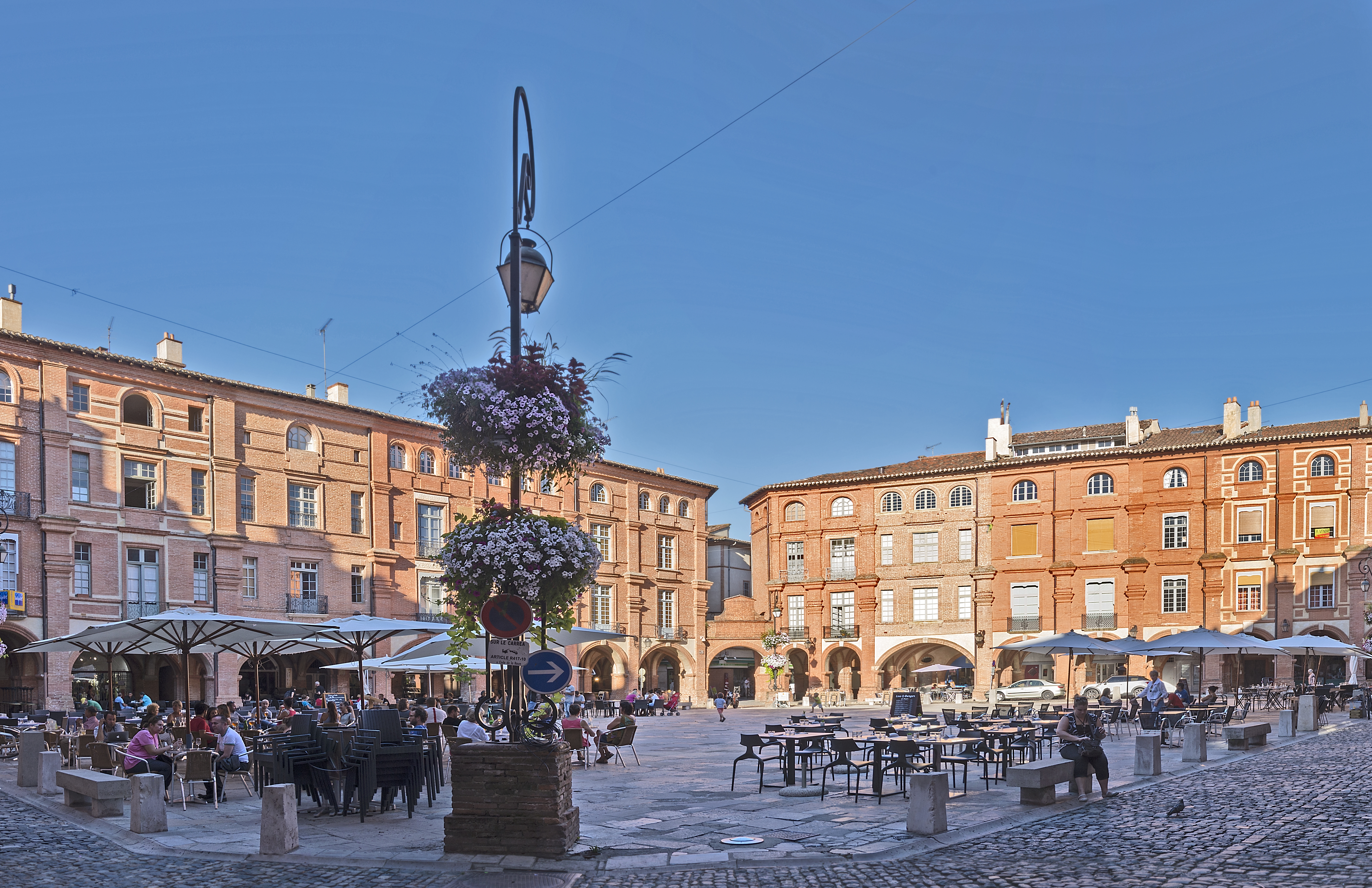
Place Nationale in Montauban

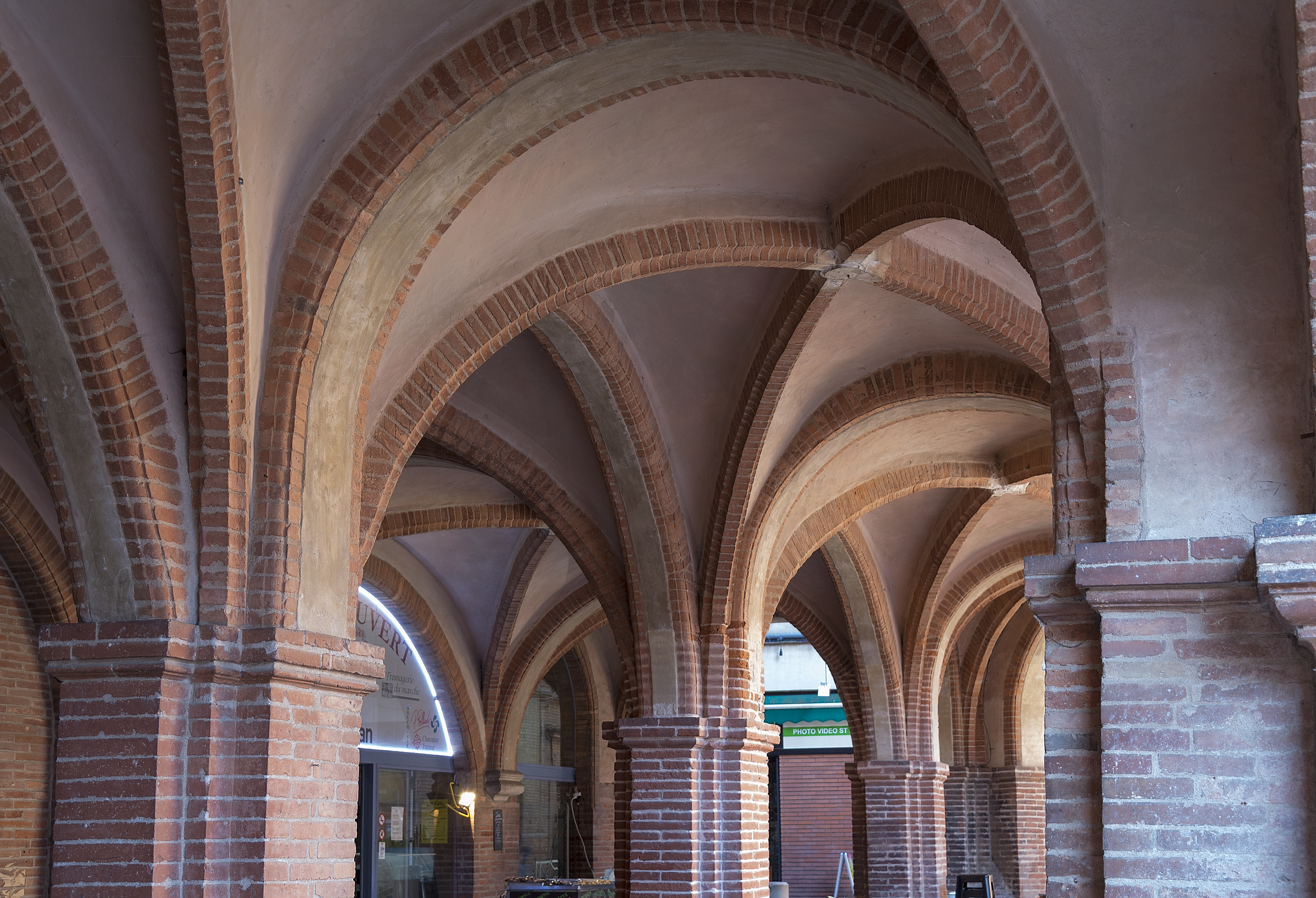
Arcade at Place Nationale

Montauban is the second oldest (after Mont-de-Marsan) of the bastides of southern France. Its foundation dates from 1144 when Count Alphonse Jourdain of Toulouse, granted it a liberal charter. The inhabitants were drawn chiefly from Montauriol, a village which had grown up around the neighbouring monastery of St Théodard.

In the 13th century the town suffered much from the ravages of the Albigensian war and from the Inquisition, but by 1317 it had recovered sufficiently to be chosen by John XXII as the head of a diocese of which the basilica of St Théodard became the cathedral.

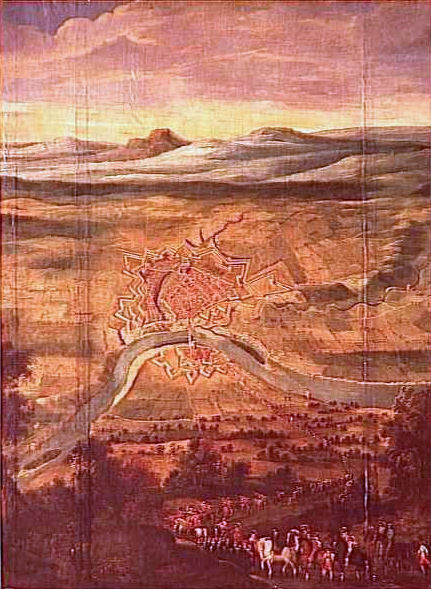
Surrender of Montauban, 21 August 1629. Château de Richelieu.

In 1360, under the Treaty of Brétigny, it was ceded to the English; they were expelled by the inhabitants in 1414. In 1560 the bishops and magistrates embraced Protestantism, expelled the monks, and demolished the cathedral. Ten years later it became one of the four Huguenot strongholds under the Peace of Saint-Germain, and formed a small independent republic. It was the headquarters of the Huguenot rebellion of 1621, and successfully withstood an 86-day siege by Louis XIII.

Because Montauban was a Protestant town, it resisted and held its position against royal power, refusing to give allegiance to the Catholic King. To scare off the King's opponents and speed up the end of the siege, 400 cannonballs were fired, but Montauban resisted and the royal army was vanquished. Saint Jacques church is still marked by the cannonballs, and every year in September, the city celebrates "les 400 coups" (the 400 shots), which has become a common phrase in French.

Montauban did not submit to royal authority until after the fall of La Rochelle in 1629, when its fortifications were destroyed by Cardinal Richelieu. The Protestants again suffered persecution later in the century, as Louis XIV began to persecute Protestants by sending troops to their homes (dragonnades) and then in 1685 revoked the Edict of Nantes, which had granted the community tolerance.

During World War II, Leonardo da Vinci's Mona Lisa was briefly hidden in a secret vault behind a wine cellar in Montauban.

== Climate ==
Montauban has a humid subtropical climate (Köppen: Cfa), with mild winters and hot summers. The town experienced severe droughts in 2003, 2006, 2012 and 2015. On 31 August 2015, the Tarn-et-Garonne area was particularly struck by a wave of violent storms. These storms, accompanied by very strong winds, created a tornado, which caused considerable damage in a large part of the department. Montauban was particularly affected, with winds measured between 130 and 150 kilometers per hour (a record) in the city center.

Climate data for Montauban (1991–2020 normals, extremes 1885–present)
Month	Jan	Feb	Mar	Apr	May	Jun	Jul	Aug	Sep	Oct	Nov	Dec	Year
Record high °C (°F)	18.5 (65.3)	25.0 (77.0)	27.8 (82.0)	30.3 (86.5)	33.5 (92.3)	40.0 (104.0)	40.1 (104.2)	42.6 (108.7)	36.1 (97.0)	34.2 (93.6)	24.8 (76.6)	19.4 (66.9)	42.6 (108.7)
Mean daily maximum °C (°F)	9.7 (49.5)	11.6 (52.9)	15.6 (60.1)	18.3 (64.9)	22.1 (71.8)	25.9 (78.6)	28.3 (82.9)	28.6 (83.5)	24.9 (76.8)	20.0 (68.0)	13.6 (56.5)	10.2 (50.4)	19.1 (66.4)
Daily mean °C (°F)	5.9 (42.6)	6.8 (44.2)	10.2 (50.4)	12.8 (55.0)	16.5 (61.7)	20.2 (68.4)	22.4 (72.3)	22.5 (72.5)	18.8 (65.8)	14.9 (58.8)	9.5 (49.1)	6.4 (43.5)	13.9 (57.0)
Mean daily minimum °C (°F)	2.2 (36.0)	2.0 (35.6)	4.7 (40.5)	7.3 (45.1)	10.9 (51.6)	14.5 (58.1)	16.5 (61.7)	16.3 (61.3)	12.7 (54.9)	9.7 (49.5)	5.4 (41.7)	2.7 (36.9)	8.7 (47.7)
Record low °C (°F)	−20.0 (−4.0)	−18.0 (−0.4)	−9.3 (15.3)	−2.8 (27.0)	−1.0 (30.2)	5.8 (42.4)	6.0 (42.8)	5.8 (42.4)	1.0 (33.8)	−3.2 (26.2)	−8.4 (16.9)	−10.6 (12.9)	−20.0 (−4.0)
Average precipitation mm (inches)	58.2 (2.29)	44.4 (1.75)	51.0 (2.01)	74.6 (2.94)	71.9 (2.83)	68.1 (2.68)	47.4 (1.87)	55.8 (2.20)	56.1 (2.21)	58.7 (2.31)	63.2 (2.49)	60.8 (2.39)	710.2 (27.96)
Average precipitation days (≥ 1.0 mm)	10.2	8.1	8.5	9.8	9.1	7.3	6.1	6.6	7.1	8.4	10.3	10.0	101.3
Mean monthly sunshine hours	83.5	119.9	176.0	189.8	220.5	242.5	270.1	259.5	213.8	154.3	93.1	80.7	2,103.8
Source: Meteociel

== Sights ==
Its fortifications have been replaced by boulevards beyond which extend numerous suburbs, while on the left bank of the Tarn is the suburb of Villebourbon, which is connected to the town by a remarkable bridge of the early 14th century. This bridge is known as Pont Vieux (i.e. "Old Bridge"). King Philip the Fair of France officially launched the building of the bridge in 1303 while on a tour to Toulouse. The project took 30 years to complete, and the bridge was inaugurated in 1335. The main architects were Étienne de Ferrières and Mathieu de Verdun. It is a pink brick structure over 205 metres (224 yards) in length, but while its fortified towers have disappeared, it is otherwise in a good state of preservation. The bridge was designed to resist the violent floods of the Tarn, and indeed it successfully withstood the two terrible millennial floods of 1441 and 1930. The bridge is a straight level bridge, which is quite unusual for Medieval Europe, where lack of technological skills meant that most bridges were of the humpback type.

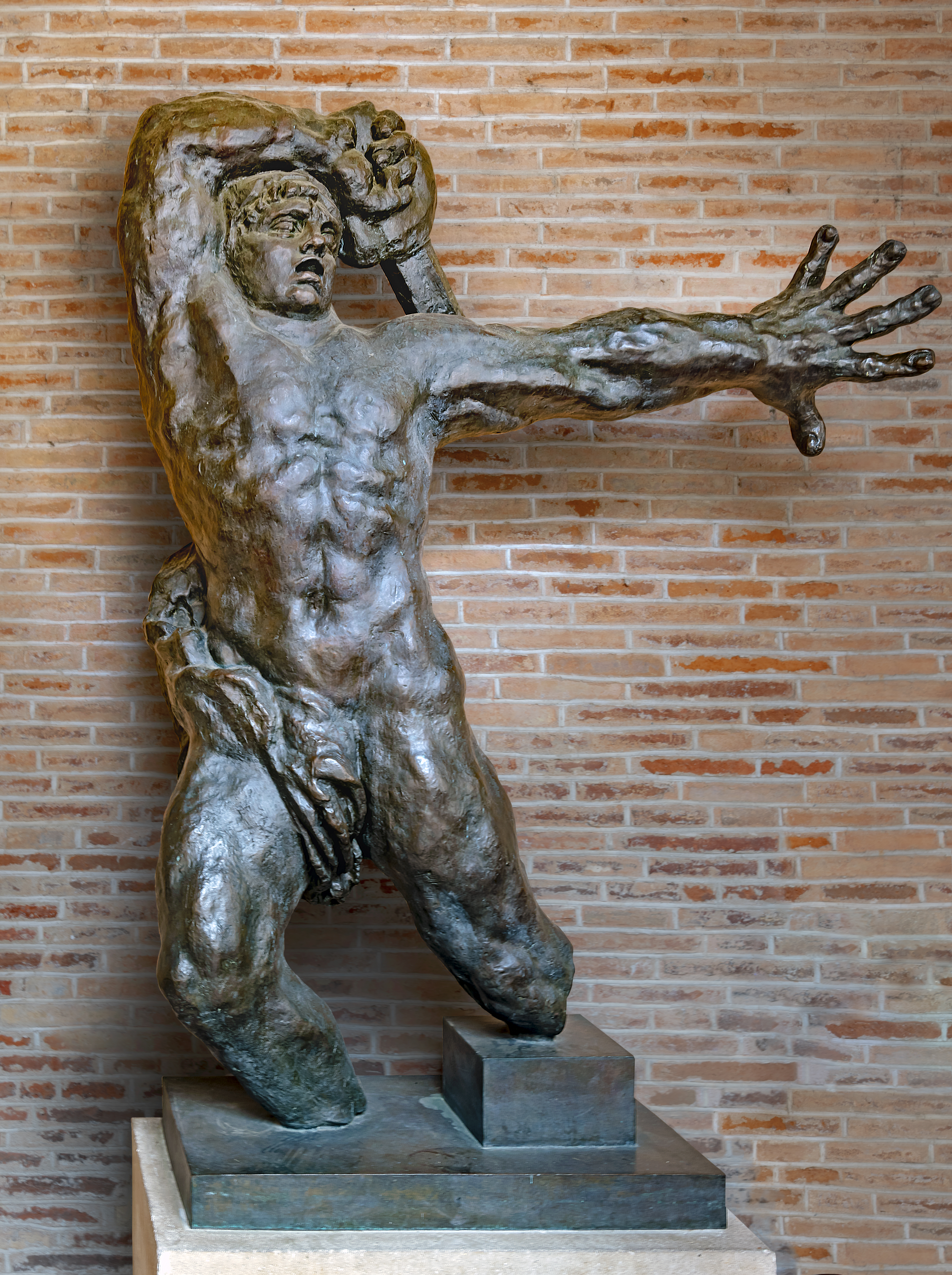
The Great Warrior of Montauban by Antoine Bourdelle.

The Musée Ingres, on the site of the castle of the Counts of Toulouse and once the residence of the bishops of Montauban, stands at the east end of the bridge. It belongs chiefly to the 17th century, but some portions are much older, notably an underground chamber known as the Hall of the Black Prince (Salle du Prince Noir). It comprises most of the work (including his "Jesus among the Teachers of the Law") of Jean Ingres, the celebrated painter, whose birth in Montauban is commemorated by an elaborate monument. It is the largest museum of Ingres paintings in the world. The museum also contains some sculptures by famous sculptor Antoine Bourdelle, another native of Montauban, as well as collections of antiquities (Greek vases) and 18th and 19th ceramics.

The Place Nationale is a square of the 17th century, entered at each corner by gateways giving access to a large open space surrounded by pink brick houses supported by double rows of arcades.

The préfecture is located in the palace built by the intendant of Montauban (the equivalent of a préfet before the French Revolution), and is a large elegant 18th century mansion, built of pink bricks and white stone, with a steep roof of blue gray slates, in a style combining northern and southern French styles of architecture.

The chief churches of Montauban are the cathedral, remarkable only for the possession of the "Vow of Louis XIII", one of the masterpieces of Ingres, and the church of St Jacques (14th and 15th centuries), dedicated to Saint James of Compostela, the façade of which is surmounted by a handsome octagonal tower, the base of which is in Romanesque style, while the upper levels, built later, are in Gothic style.

== Economy ==
The commercial importance of Montauban is due to its trade in agricultural produce, horses, game and poultry, than to its industries, which include nursery-gardening, cloth-weaving, cloth-dressing, flour-milling, wood-sawing, and the manufacture of furniture, silk-gauze and straw hats.

However, due to the proximity of Toulouse and the cheaper cost of industrial grounds, more and more mechanical products are being manufactured there.

== Demographics ==
Montauban is the centre of an urban area with 79,300 inhabitants as of 2017.

Historical population

Year	Pop.	±% p.a.
1793	26,160	—
1800	21,950	−2.48%
1806	23,973	+1.48%
1821	25,357	+0.37%
1831	24,660	−0.28%
1836	23,865	−0.65%
1841	23,561	−0.26%
1846	25,102	+1.28%
1851	24,726	−0.30%
1856	25,095	+0.30%
1861	27,054	+1.51%
1866	25,991	−0.80%
1872	25,624	−0.24%
1876	26,952	+1.27%
1881	28,335	+1.01%
1886	29,863	+1.06%
1891	30,388	+0.35%
1896	29,470	−0.61%
1901	30,506	+0.69%

Year	Pop.	±% p.a.
1906	28,688	−1.22%
1911	29,778	+0.75%
1921	26,094	−1.31%
1926	28,829	+2.01%
1931	29,981	+0.79%
1936	32,025	+1.33%
1946	36,281	+1.26%
1954	38,321	+0.69%
1962	41,002	+0.85%
1968	45,872	+1.89%
1975	48,028	+0.66%
1982	50,682	+0.77%
1990	51,224	+0.13%
1999	51,855	+0.14%
2007	55,438	+0.84%
2012	56,887	+0.52%
2017	60,810	+1.34%
2023	62,945	+0.58%

Source: EHESS and INSEE (1968–2023)

== Transport ==
The town is a railway junction, and the station Gare de Montauban-Ville-Bourbon offers connections with Toulouse, Bordeaux, Paris, Brive-la-Gaillarde, Marseille and several regional destinations. Montauban communicates with the Garonne via the Canal de Montech. The nearest airport is Toulouse–Blagnac Airport, located 54 km (34 mi) south of Montauban.

== Monuments ==
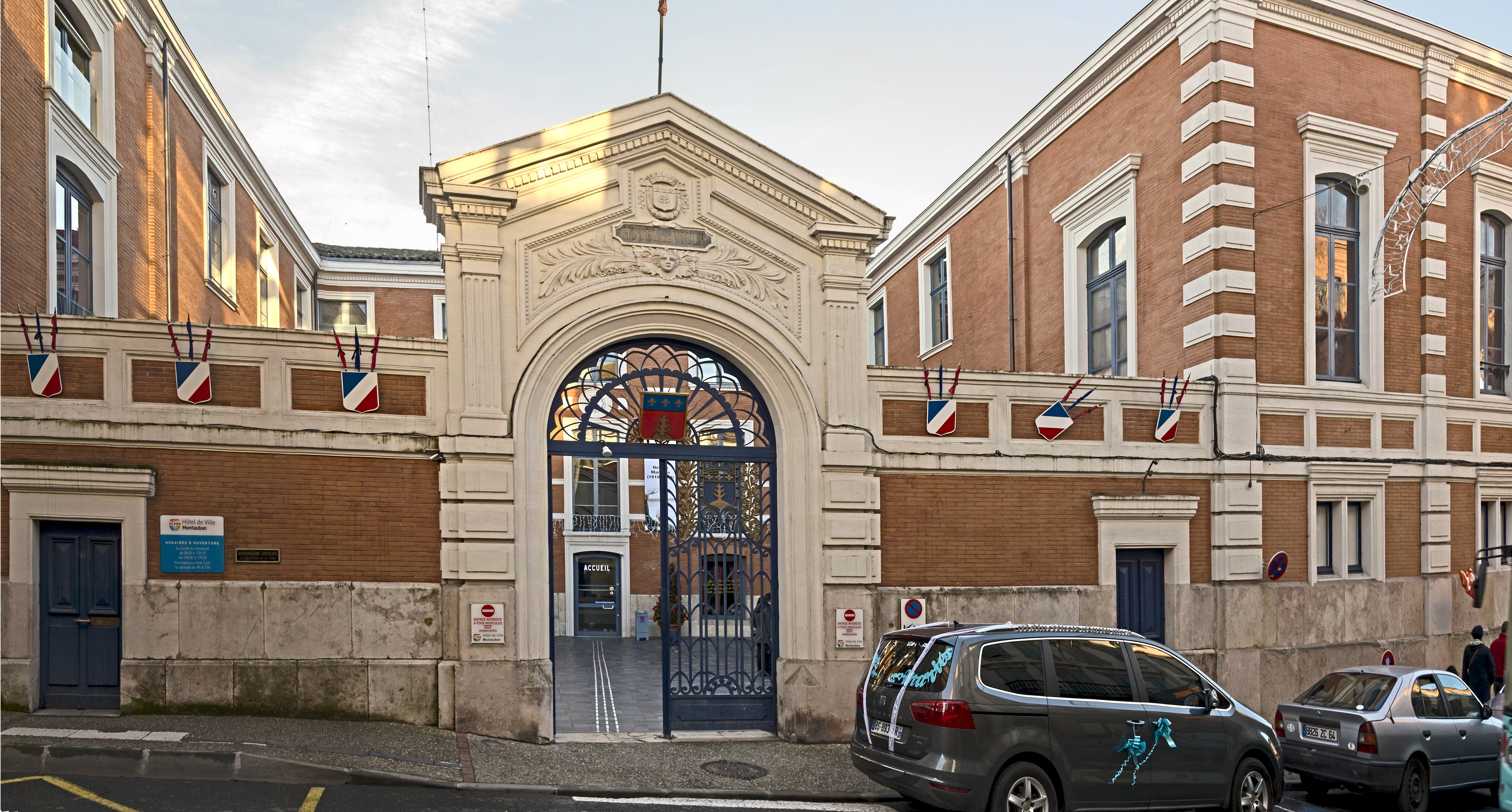
Hôtel de Ville (town hall)

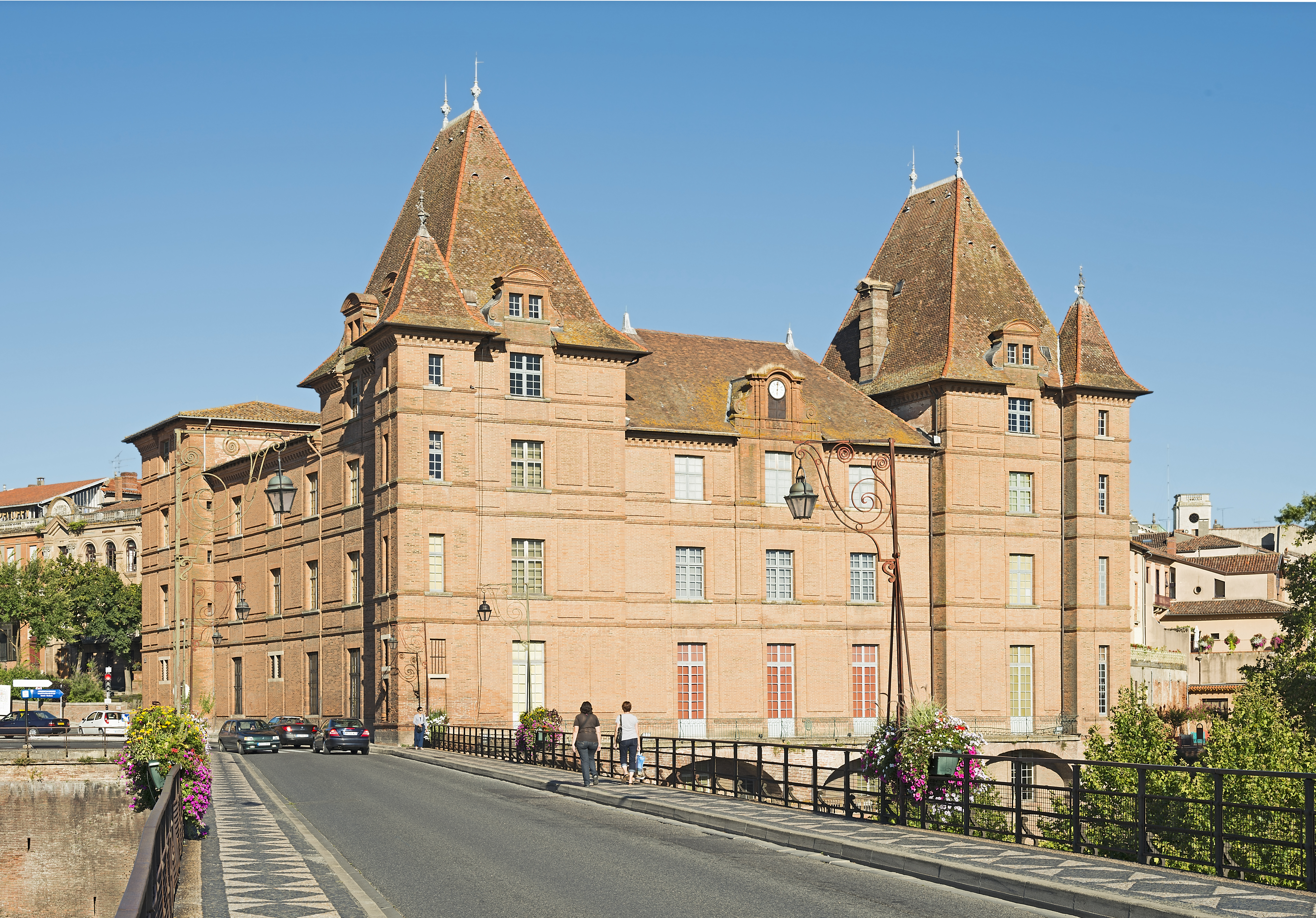
Musée Ingres Bourdelle (Ingres-Bourdelle Museum)

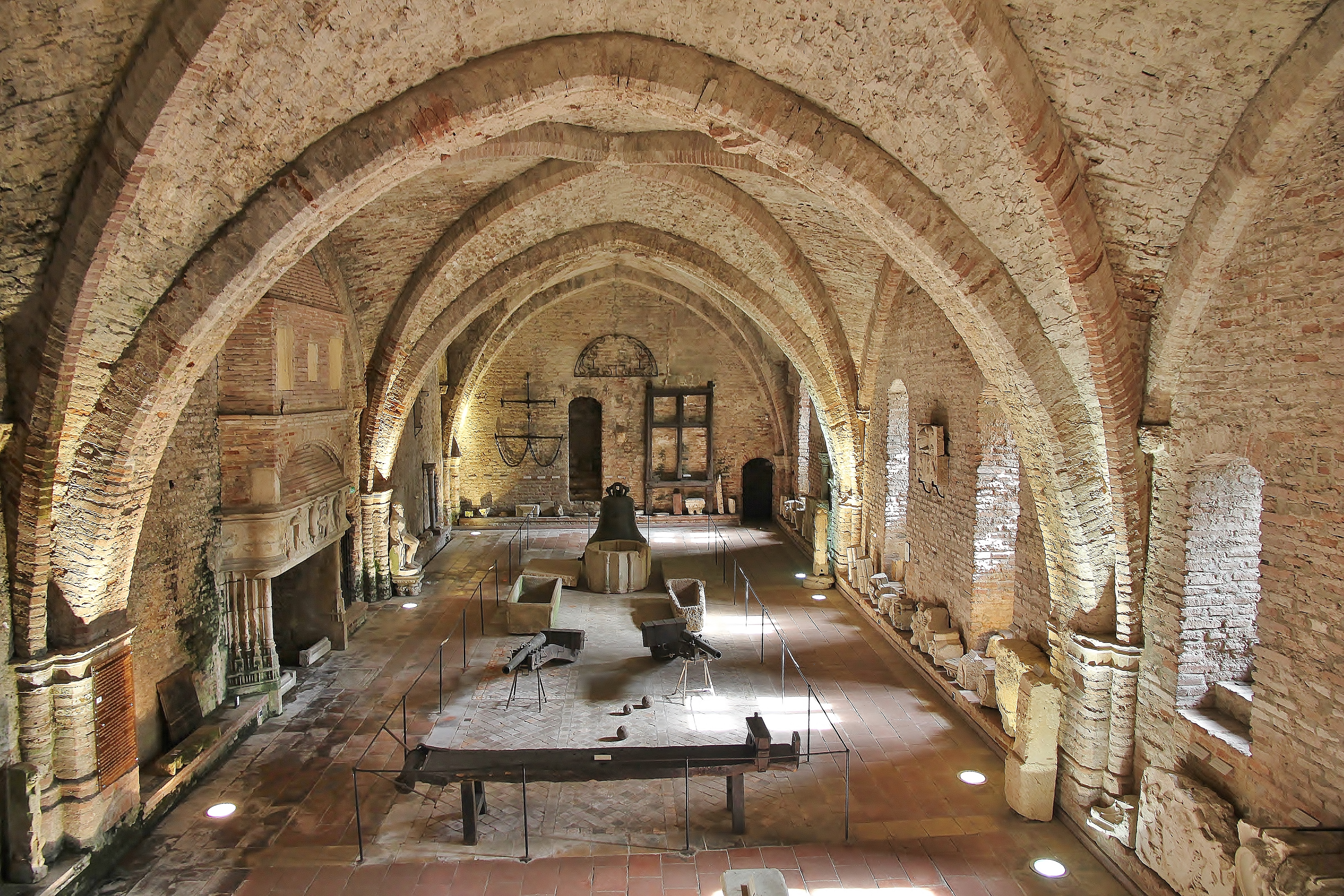
The Hall of the Black Prince (14th c.)

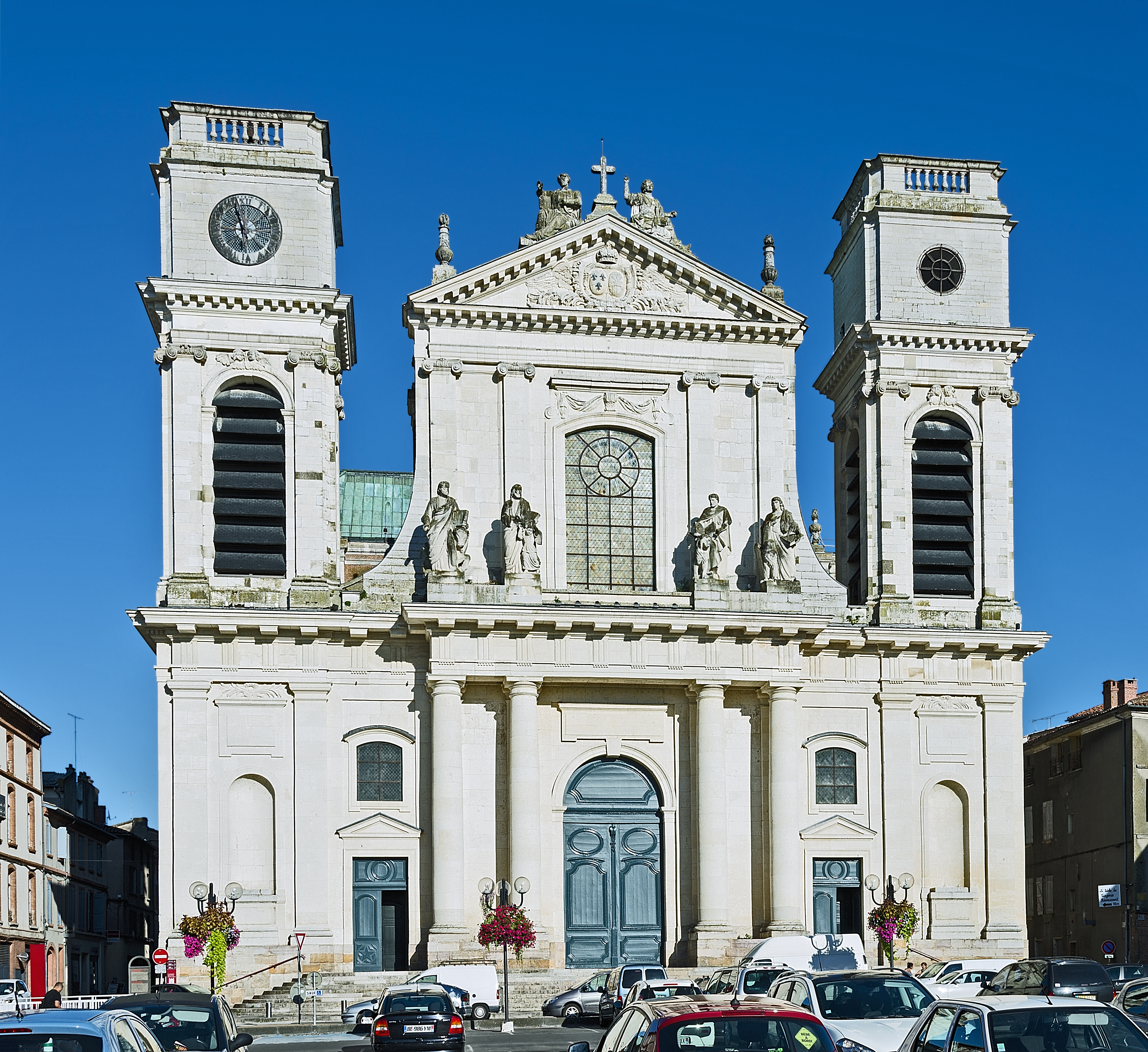
Cathedral

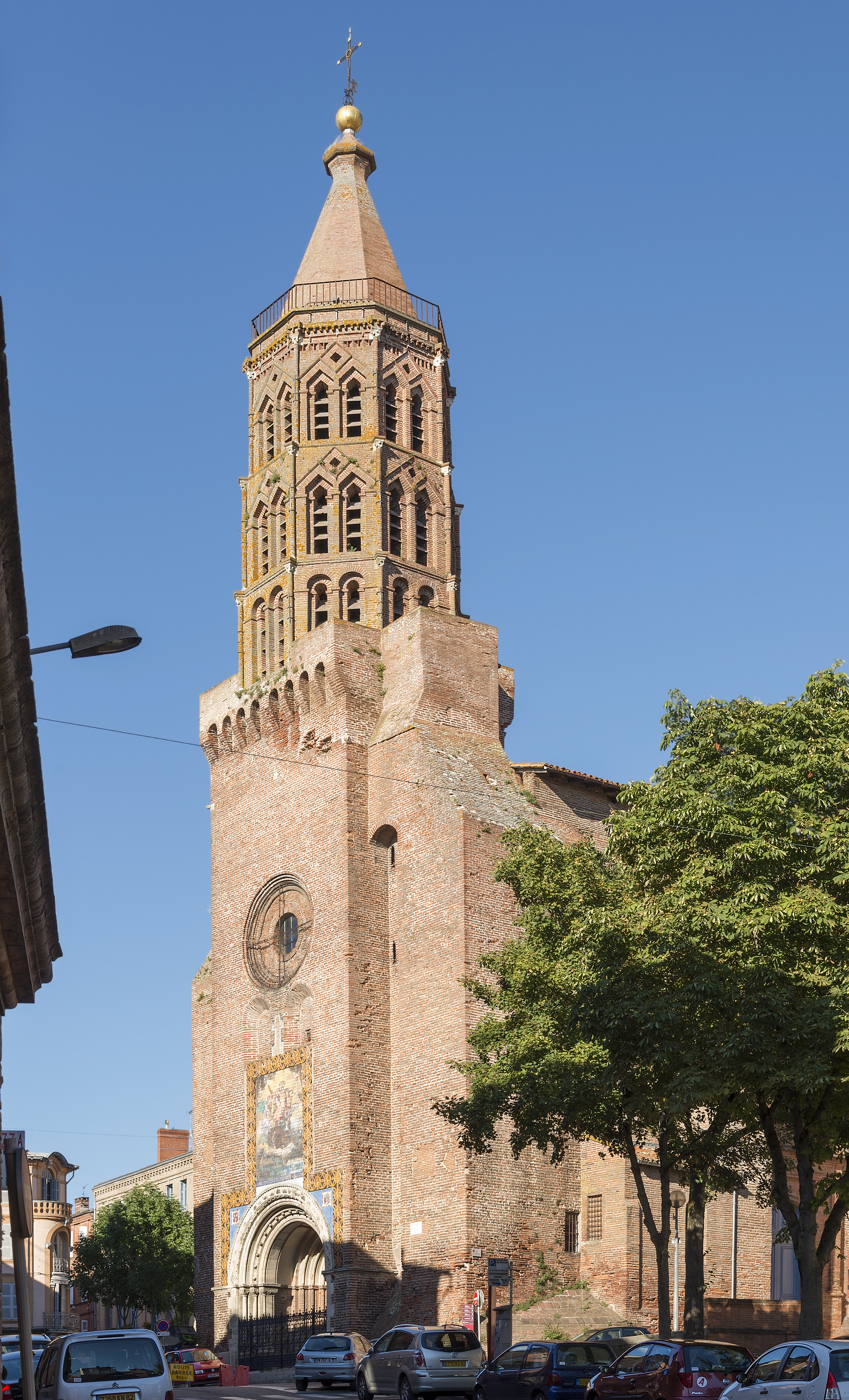
Church of Saint-Jacques

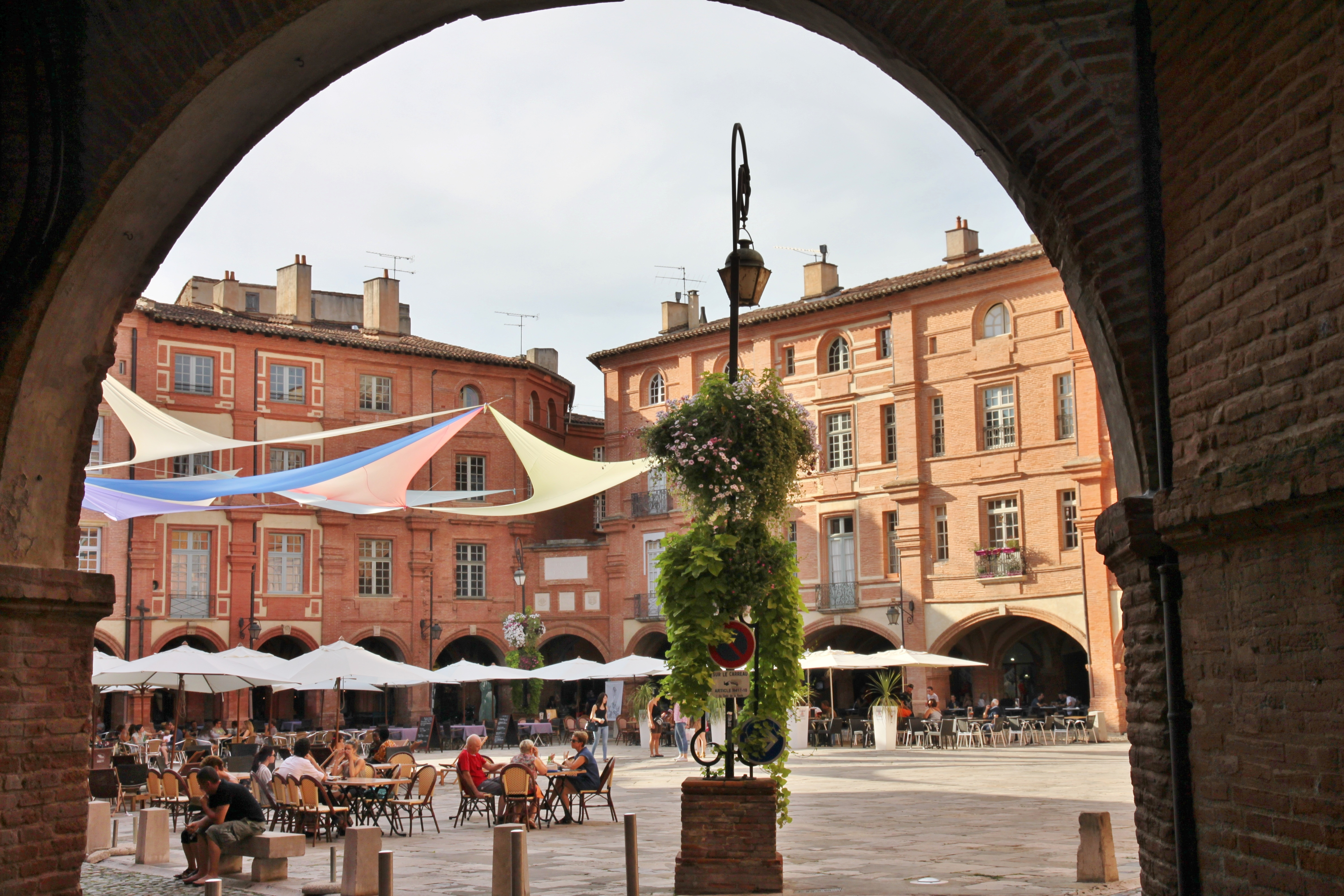
Place Nationale

Founded in 1144 by the Comte de Toulouse, the town of Montauban has some particularities: its center's red brick streets intersect at right angles and meet at the National Square (Place Nationale) which is ranked among the most beautiful squares of France. Some buildings and architectural complexes are distinguished, such as "le Musée Ingres", "la Place Nationale", "le Pont vieux", "L'église Saint Jacques", "la Cathédrale Notre Dame", « l'Ancien Collège des Jésuites », « le Muséum ».

== Main sights ==
- The Ingres-Bourdelle Museum is the old town hall and an episcopal palace built in 1664 at the initiative of Pierre de Bertier on the remains of the palace that the Black Prince occupied during the Hundred Years' War. Some of the rooms of the latter, in the basements, are open to visitors. The building houses works by two former residents: Jean-Auguste-Dominique Ingres and Antoine Bourdelle.
- The fortified church of Saint-Jacques. Of the second church built in the XIII-th century, only the Toulouse-style bell tower and part of the nave remain. In the XIVth century, the flat apse was replaced by a polygonal apse, while the city was going through a period of prosperity and the church became the seat of a parish. Transformed into a watchtower (bell tower), saltpeter manufacturing workshop (nave) and fort (choir) during the French Wars of Religion, Saint-Jacques still bears traces of cannonballs from the siege of 1621 on its facade. After the Catholic reconquest (1629), Cardinal Richelieu ordered the identical reconstruction of the church. Once a cathedral (1629–1739), in the 18th century it was equipped with new side portals and a gallery. On the facade, the Neo-Romanesque portal topped with a mosaic dates from the XIX-th century.
- The Hôtel de Ville (town hall) was commissioned as a private house and completed c. 1695.

== Sport ==
The town is home of the rugby union club US Montauban. The team gained promotion from the Pro D2 competition for the 2006–07 Top 14 season. The whole town supports rugby, but the athletic club is also very efficient and national results have been regular since 2007. Some athletes in Montauban's athletic club are international athletes. Every year, since 2004, the Rene Arcuset cross country race has been organized in the city.

== Movies ==
In the movie Les Tontons Flingueurs a French classic by Georges Lautner, shot and released in 1963, Lino Ventura's character is a businessman from Montauban. Called to Paris for a personal case, he is nicknamed by Bernard Blier's character "Le gugusse de Montauban" (the guy from Montauban.) The "gugusse" will later answer: "one should never leave Montauban". Recently, a round-about in the center of the town was renamed "Tonton Flingueurs' round-about" and placards with drawings of the actors have been displayed.

== Personalities ==
Montauban was the birthplace of:

- Jean-Baptiste Massip (1676–1751), 18th-century French playwright, poet, librettist
- Marquis Jean-Jacques Lefranc of Pompignan (1709–1784), poet
- Jacques Antoine Hippolyte, Comte de Guibert (1743–1790), general and military writer
- Olympe de Gouges (1748–1793), playwright and journalist whose feminist writings reached a large audience
- Jean Bon Saint-André (1749–1813), French revolutionary
- Jean Auguste Dominique Ingres, (1780–1867), painter
- Paul-Henry de Belvèze, (1801–1875), French sailor
- Adrien Joseph Prax-Paris (1829–1909), Bonapartist deputy for Tarn-et-Garonne during the Second French Empire and the French Third Republic.
- Joseph Lachaud de Loqueyssie (1848–1896), deputy of Tarn-et-Garonne in 1877–81.
- Antoine Bourdelle (1861–1929), sculptor and teacher
- Camille Gardelle (1866–1947), architect who designed many famous buildings in Uruguay
- Léon Bourjade (1889–1924), French fighter pilot during World War One and Catholic missionary
- Daniel Cohn-Bendit (b. 1943), leader of May '68 student protests and MEP
- Vincent de Swarte (1963–2006), writer
- Didier Rous (b. 1970), former road cyclist
- Mathieu Perget (b. 1984), former road cyclist
- Alexis Palisson (b. 1987), rugby union player
- Valentin Rosier (b. 1996), football player
- Alessandro Ghiretti (b.2002), racing driver

Montauban was the death place of:

- Manuel Azaña (1880–1940), the last President of the Second Spanish Republic (1931–1939), died in exile

== Institutions ==
Montauban is the seat of a bishop and a court of assize. It has tribunals of first instance and of commerce, a chamber of commerce and a board of trade arbitration, lycées and a training college, schools of commerce and viticulture, a branch of the Bank of France, and a faculty of Protestant theology.

== Sister cities ==
- Pawhuska, Oklahoma, USA
- Gourbeyre, France
- Yokneam, Israel
- Khemisset, Morocco
- Kozarac, Bosnia and Herzegovina
- Prokuplje, Serbia

== See also ==
- Communes of the Tarn-et-Garonne department
