= Cubjac-Auvézère-Val d'Ans =

- Commune
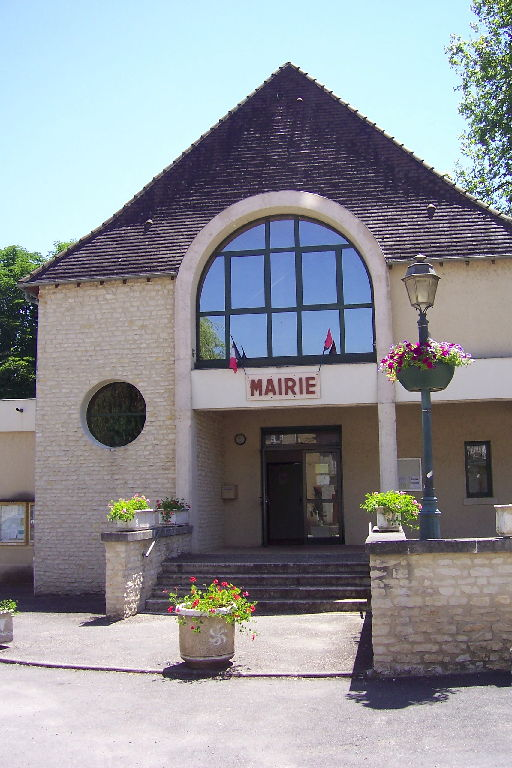
- The town hall in Cubjac
- Location of Cubjac-Auvézère-Val d'Ans
- Location within France Location within Nouvelle-Aquitaine
- Coordinates: 45°13′16″N 0°56′17″E
- Country: France
- Region: Nouvelle-Aquitaine
- Department: Dordogne
- Arrondissement: Nontron
- Canton: Isle-Loue-Auvézère
- Intercommunality: Isle-Loue-Auvézère en Périgord

Government
  - Mayor (2022–2026): Elodie Choury
- Area^{1}: 39.56 km^{2} (15.27 sq mi)
- Population (2023): 1,127
  - Density: 28.49/km^{2} (73.78/sq mi)
- Time zone: UTC+01:00 (CET)
  - Summer (DST): UTC+02:00 (CEST)
- INSEE/Postal code: 24147 /24640
- ^{1} French Land Register data, which excludes lakes, ponds, glaciers > 1 km^{2} (0.386 sq mi or 247 acres) and river estuaries.

Cubjac-Auvézère-Val d'Ans (French pronunciation: [kybʒak ovezɛʁ val dɑ̃s]; Limousin: Cujac Auvesera Vau d'Ans or Cujac-Auvesera-Vau d'Ans) is a commune in the department of Dordogne, southwestern France. The municipality was established on 1 January 2017 by merger of the former communes of Cubjac (the seat), La Boissière-d'Ans and Saint-Pantaly-d'Ans.

== See also ==
- Communes of the Dordogne department
