= Jean-Baptiste Massip =

French lawyer, poet and playwright (1676–1751)

Jean-Baptiste Massip (1676 in Montauban, Quercy – 1751 Montauban) was an 18th-century French lawyer, poet, playwright and librettist.

After completing his studies, Massip obtained a law degree and devoted himself to the bar. A lawyer by the Parlement, Massip wrote a large number of elegant and delicate French and Gascon songs before heading to Paris where he was able to conciliate the esteem of the chancelier de Pontchartrain who appointed him his gentleman, gave him a position of royal censor, with pension, and bequeathed him a pension of five hundred pounds when he died in 1727.

The sympathies that had hosted his first poetic productions emboldened him to compose for the stage and so, aged 58, he wrote for the Académie royale de musique, les Fêtes nouvelles (Paris, J.-B. Ballard, 1734, in-4°), ballet with three entrées, with prologue, music by Duplessis le cadet, which was presented with success at the Opéra, 12 July 1734. Later, Massip wrote la Coquette démasquée, five-act comedy in prose for the Comédie-Italienne and la Mort d’Alexandre, a tragedy.

He also authored some Poésies fugitives and an Épître au Roi on the illness which threatened Louis XV's life in Metz.

Massip was a member of the literary society founded in Montauban by Le Franc de Pompignan.

== Sources ==
- Émerand Forestié, Biographie de Tarn-et-Garonne, Montauban, 1860, (p. 153-7).
