= Musée Ingres Bourdelle =

Art museum in France

Coordinates: 44°1′1″N 1°21′6″E

Ingres Bourdelle Museum
- Musée Ingres Bourdelle
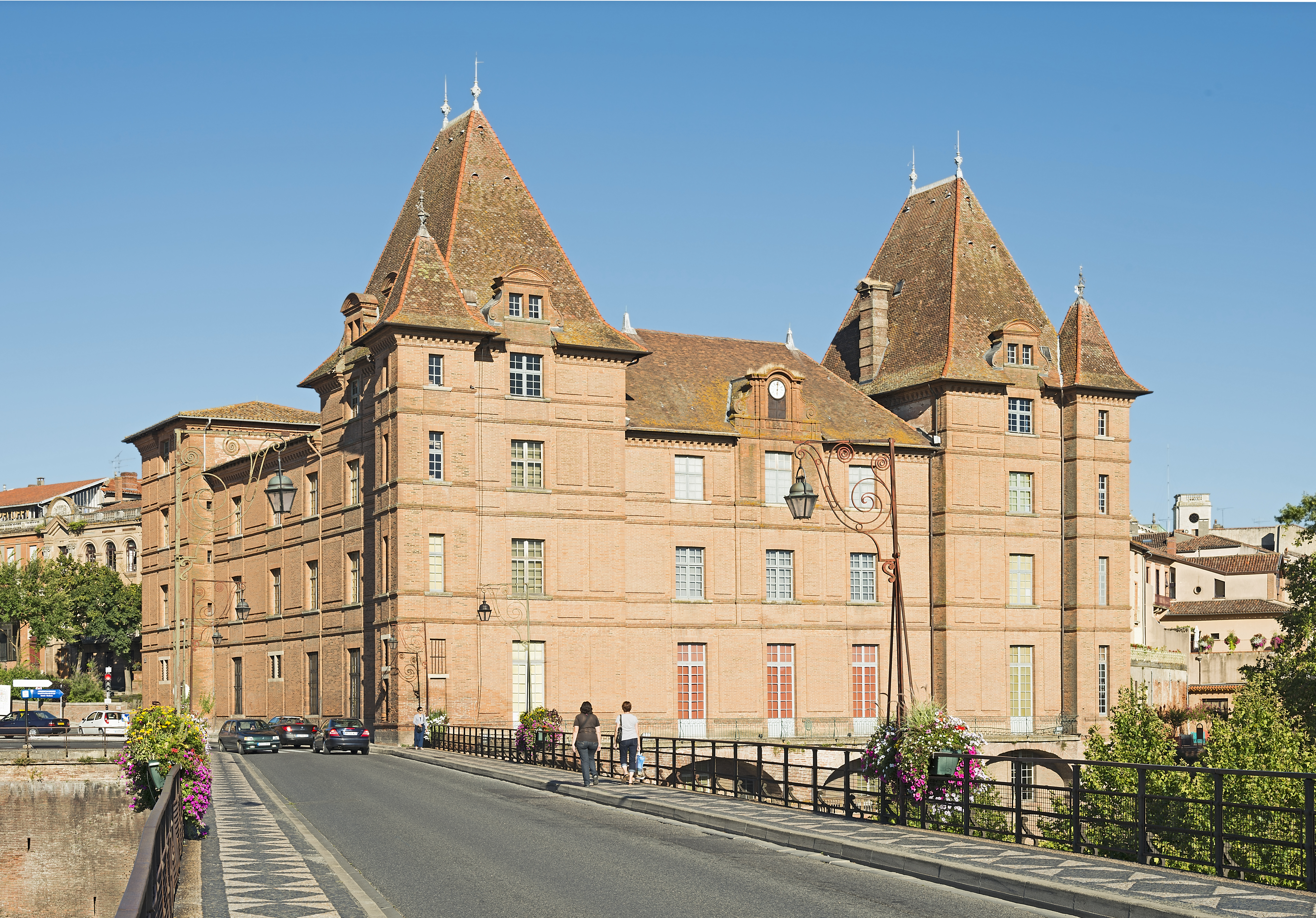
- View of the museum building
- Established: 1854
- Location: 19, Rue de l'Hôtel de Ville 82000 Montauban
- Type: Art museum
- Visitors: 38,303 (2003) 67,810 (2004) 38,252 (2005) 43,093 (2006) 50,481 (2007)
- Director: Florence Viguier
- Website: museeingresbourdelle.com (fr)

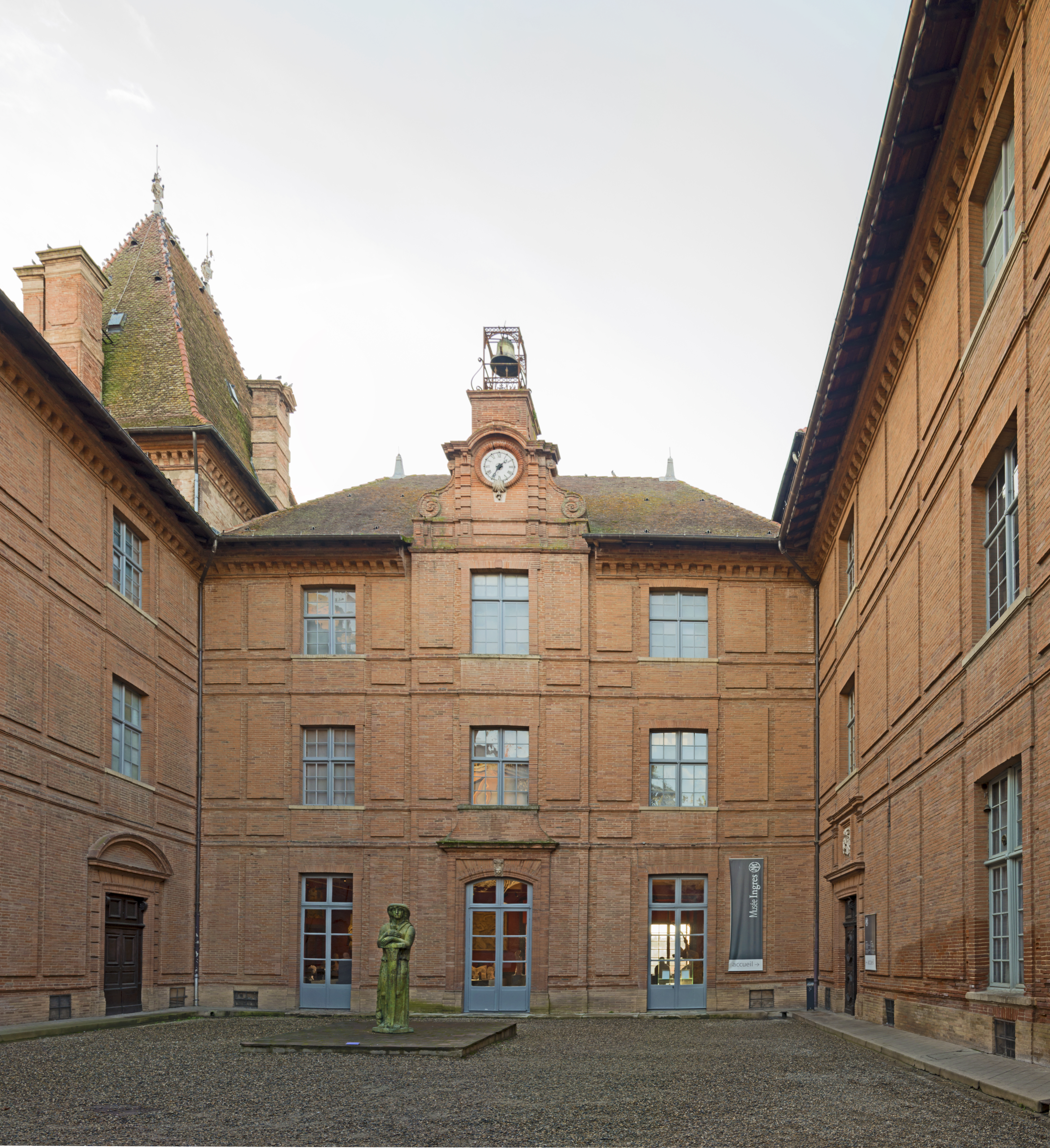
Courtyard

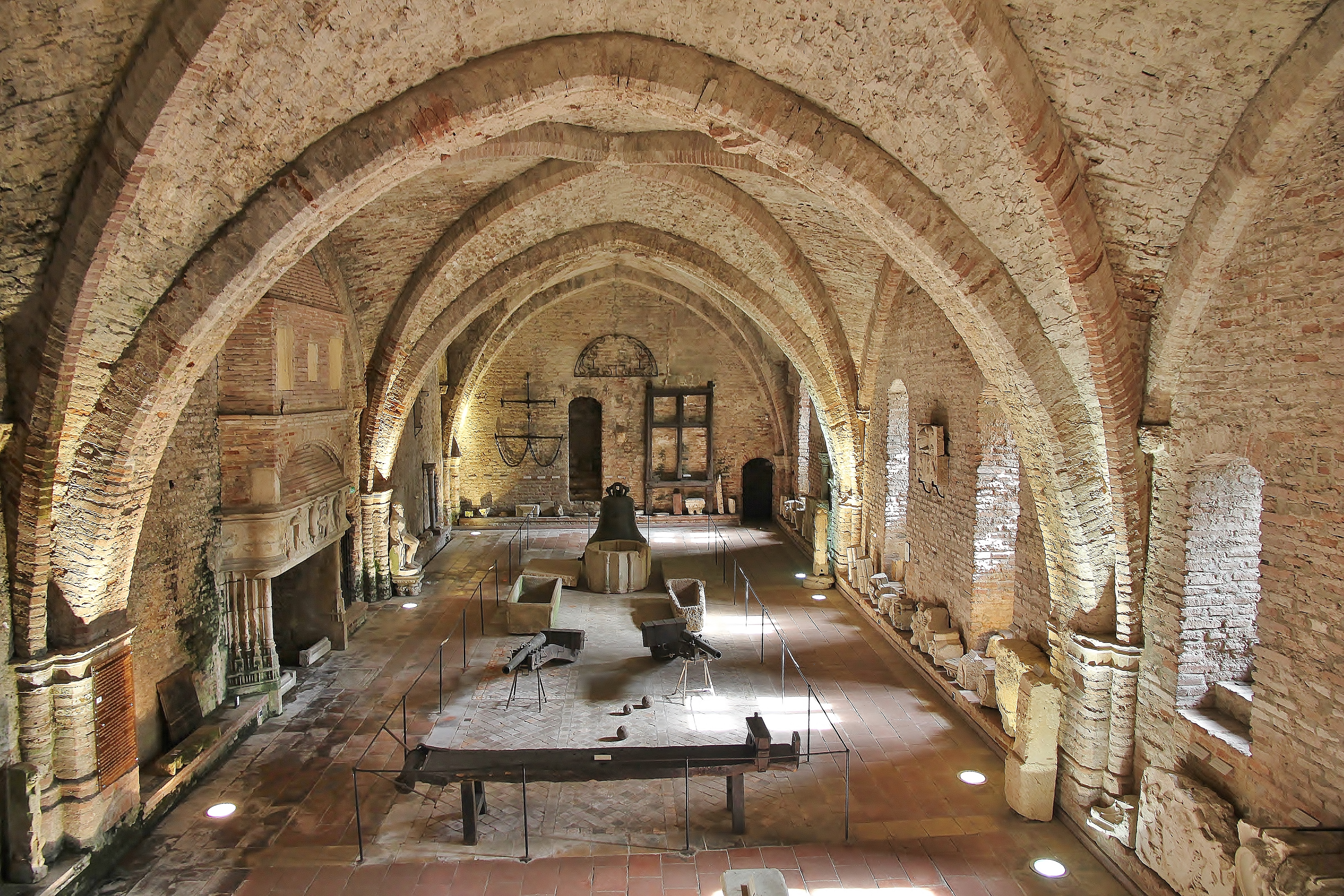
The Hall of the Black Prince

The Musée Ingres Bourdelle (In English: Ingres Bourdelle Museum) is located in Montauban, France. It houses a collection of artworks and artifacts related to two famous artists natives of that town, painter Jean Auguste Dominique Ingres and sculptor Antoine Bourdelle, as well as their own collections and other works of art.

== History ==
The building was commissioned by Pierre de Bertier in 1664. The structure belongs chiefly to the 17th century, but some portions are much older, notably an underground chamber known as the Hall of the Black Prince (Salle du Prince Noir). It served as the bishop's palace before the French Revolution, then became the town hall. As the town hall, it was also used for public events: on 2 September 1844, the pianist, Franz Liszt, performed a recital there, at a time when Lisztomania was at its height.

In 1851, Jean Auguste Dominique Ingres, at 71 years of age, gave part of his collection, including copies, work of pupils, and Greek vases, as a gift to the city of his birth. The Ingres room was inaugurated in 1854. The death of Ingres in January 1867 led to a considerable enrichment of the collection with additional works, in particular several thousands of drawings. The building was solely used as a museum after the town council relocated to the former Hôtel d'Aliès de Cieurac in 1908. The building was classified as a monument historique by decree of March 11, 1910.

== Collection ==
During World War II, the Musée Ingres served as one of the temporary places of storage for the Mona Lisa, evacuated from the Louvre at the beginning of the war. A renovation carried out between 1951 and 1958 made Musée Ingres a modern institution according to the designs of the time, equipped with additional inventories. Expanded, modernized and digitized, the museum now covers 2,700 m2 with new spaces, improved accessibility, a new museography, a conservation cabinet housing Ingres's drawings, an entire floor devoted to the work of Antoine Bourdelle, rooms for temporary exhibitions. The Ingres Museum took advantage of its transformation to change its name and become the Ingres-Bourdelle Museum, thus paying homage to the two artists that the city saw born. There are other places that also pay homage to Antoine Bourdelle, such as the Musée Bourdelle in Paris or the Bourdelle Garden Museum in Égreville.

Among the paintings by Ingres in the collection are:

- Joseph Ingres (1804)
- Jean-François Gilibert (1804)
- Lorenzo Bartolini (1805)
- The Dream of Ossian (1813)
- Christ Giving the Keys to St. Peter (1820)
- Roger Freeing Angelica (1841 version)
- Madame Henri Gonse (1845–1852)
- Jesus among the Doctors (1862)
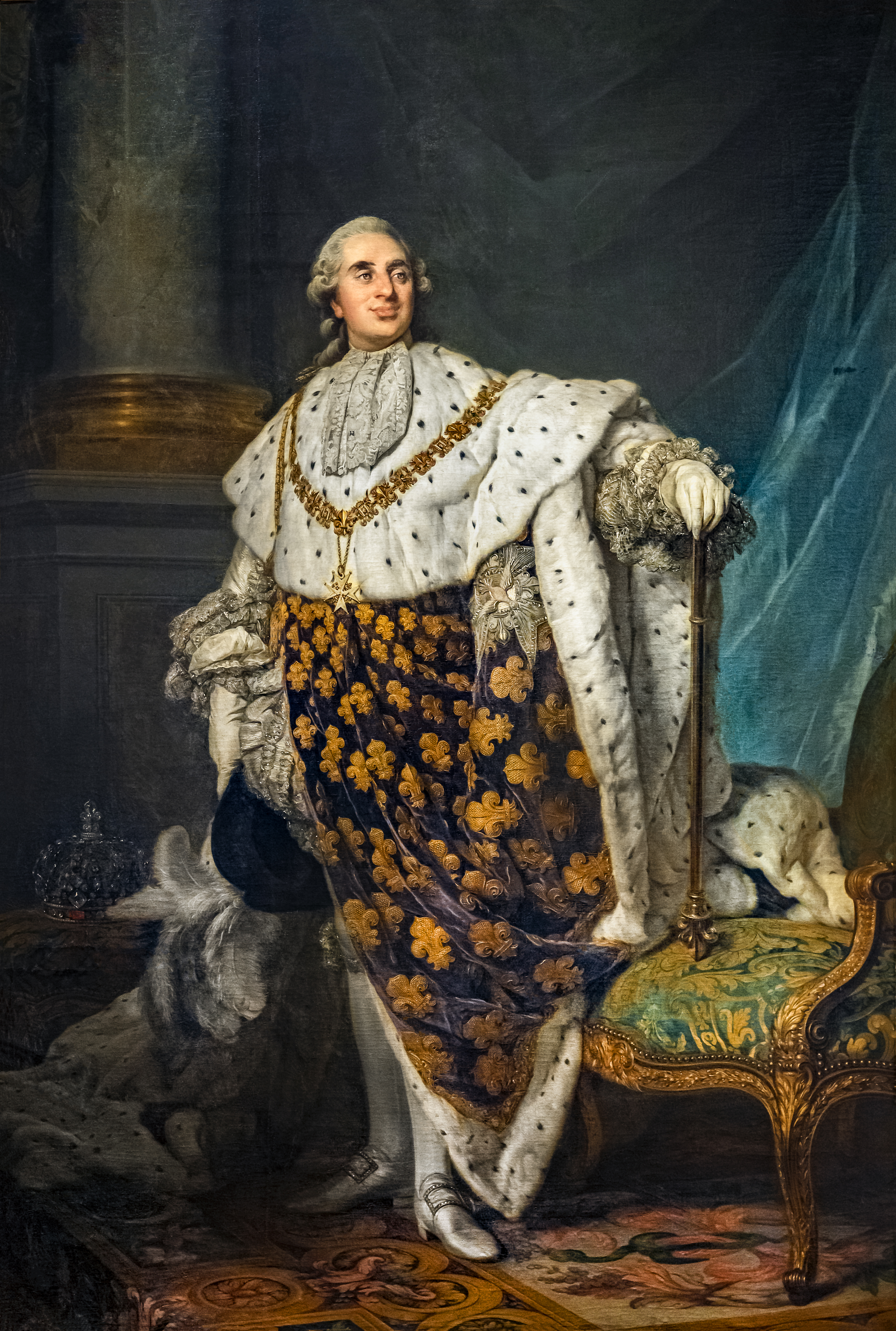
Portrait of Louis XVI by Joseph Duplessis, 1776

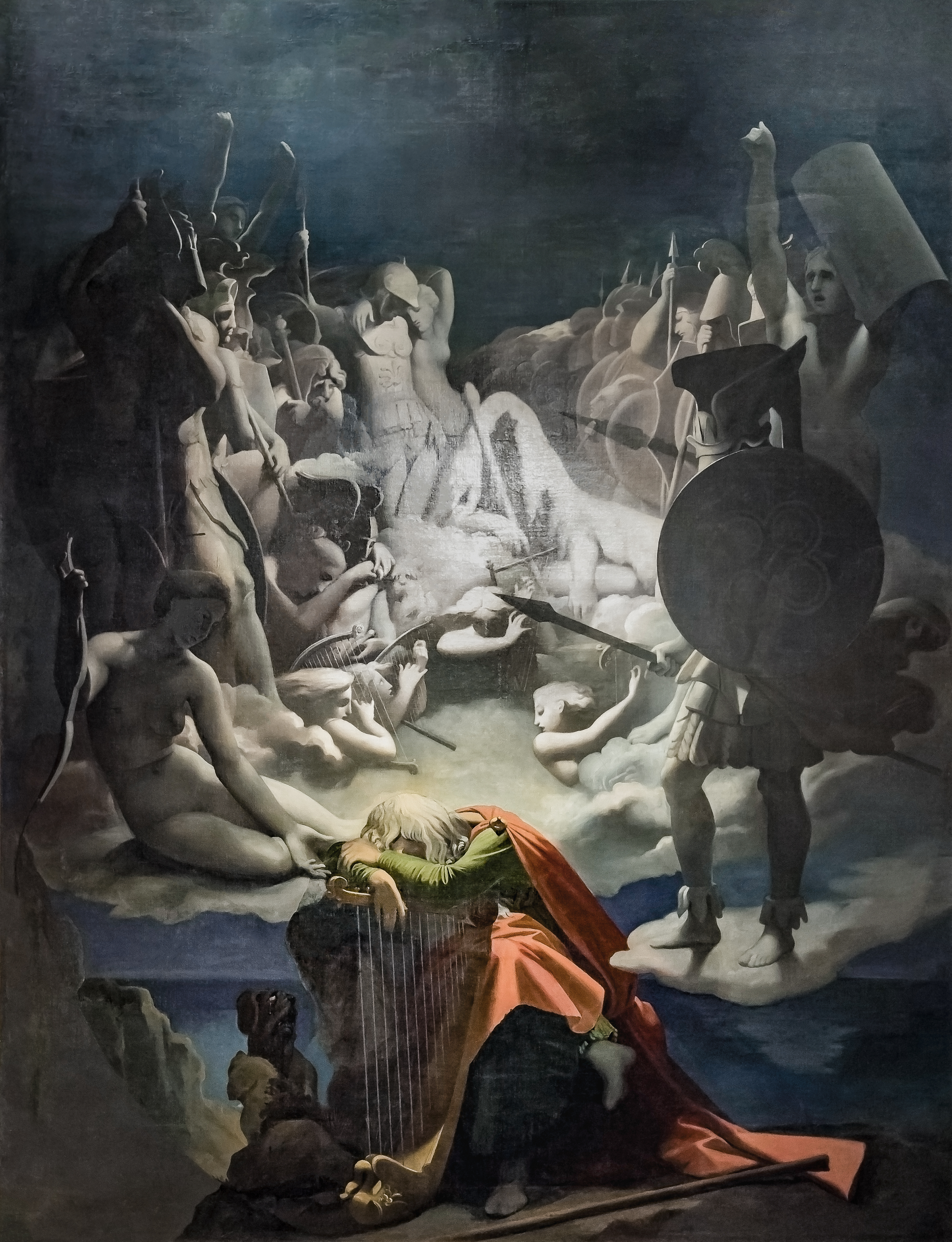
Ingres – The Dream of Ossian

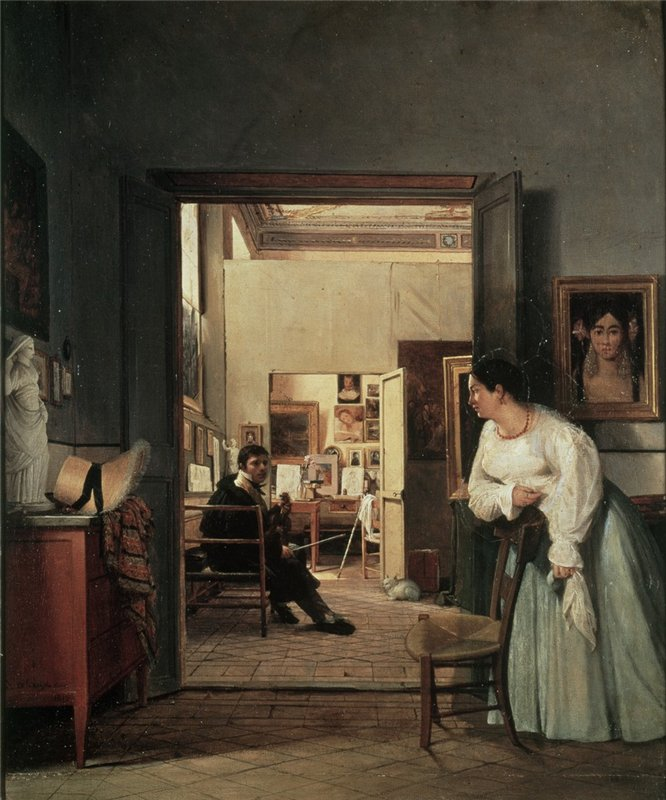
The Studio of Ingres in Rome by Jean Alaux, 1818

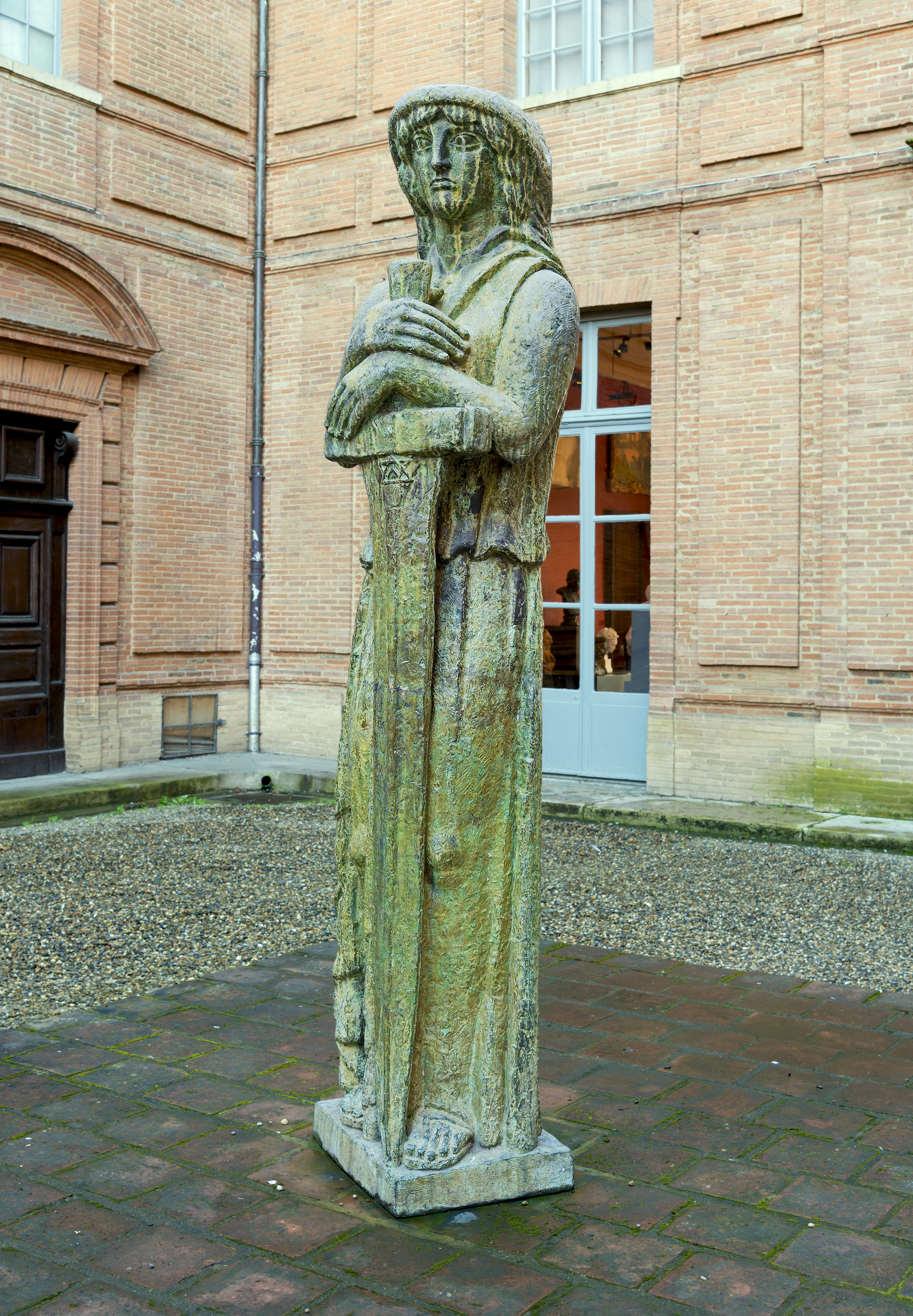
Bourdelle – Victory of Hartmannwillerkopf

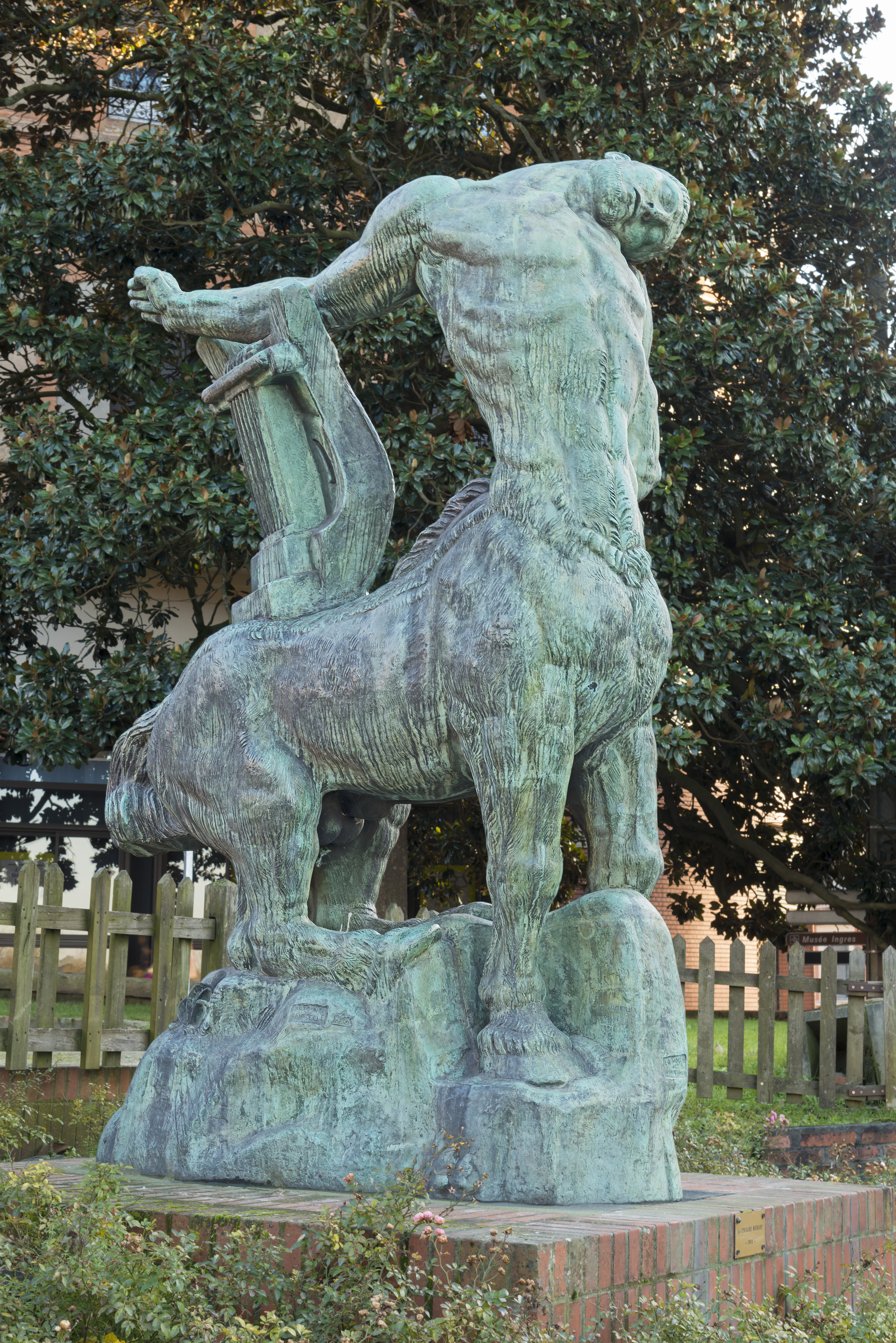
Bourdelle – La mort du dernier centaure

== See also ==
- List of paintings by Jean-Auguste-Dominique Ingres
- List of works by Antoine Bourdelle
