= Hôtel de Ville, Montauban =

Town hall in Montauban, France

Hôtel de Ville
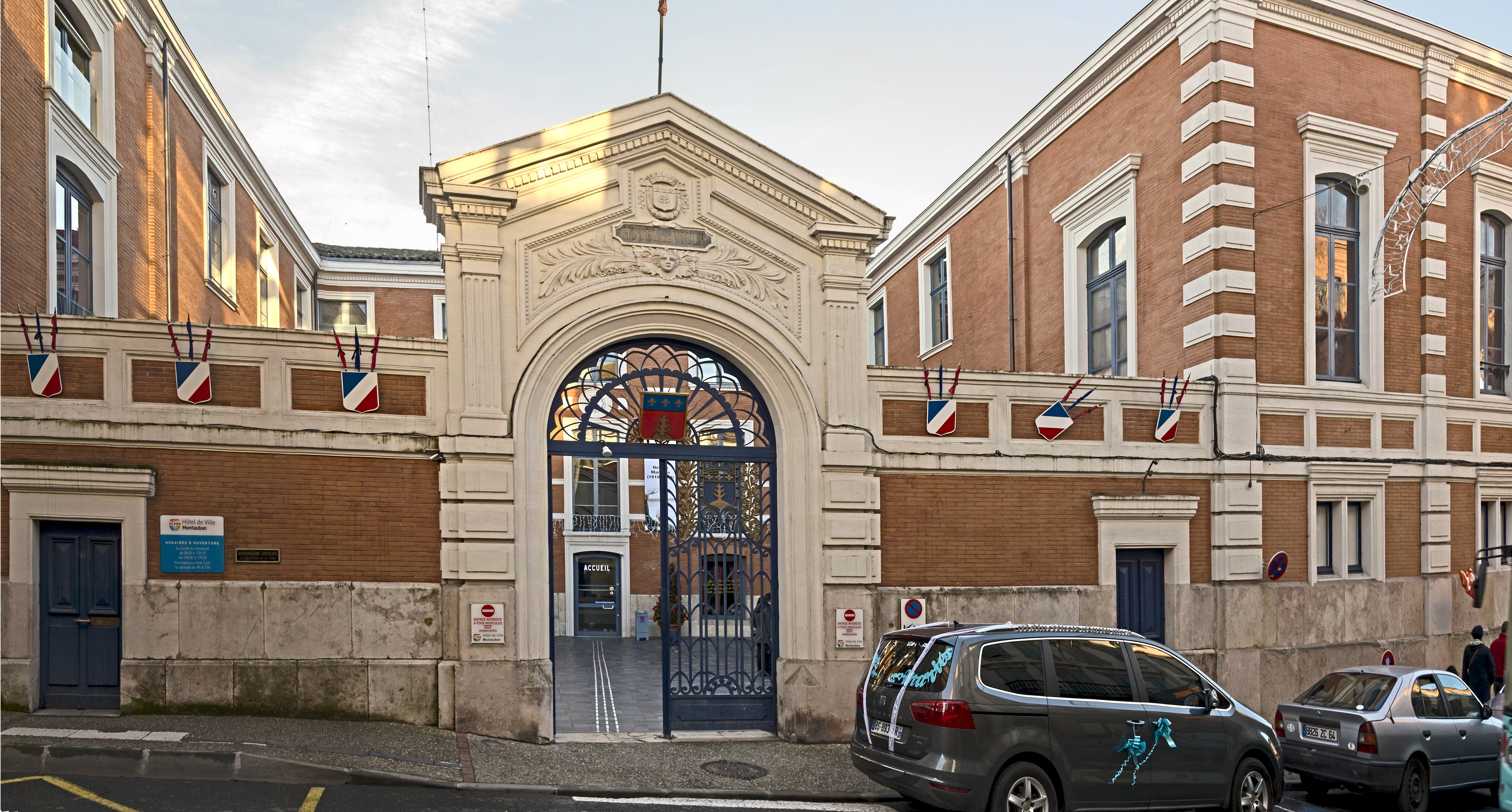
- The main frontage of the Hôtel de Ville in December 2013
- Interactive map of the Hôtel de Ville area

General information
- Type: City hall
- Architectural style: Neoclassical style
- Location: Montauban, France
- Coordinates: 44.0163°N 1.3527°E
- Completed: c. 1695

Design and construction
- Architect: François d'Orbay

The Hôtel de Ville (French pronunciation: [otɛl də vil], City Hall) is a municipal building in Montauban, Tarn-et-Garonne, southern France, standing on Rue de l'Hôtel de Ville. It has been included on the Inventaire général des monuments by the French Ministry of Culture since 2010.

== History ==
The building was commissioned as a private mansion. The earliest parts of the structure were built around the same time as Montauban Cathedral, which was located further to the southeast along the Rue des Bains (now the Rue de l'Hôtel de Ville). The foundation stone was laid in 1692. It was designed by François d'Orbay, using the same stones and master builder as the cathedral, and was completed c. 1695. (Note: The main part of the house was completed shortly before d'Orbay died in 1697.) A dovecote was erected on the roof in 1706.

In the mid-18th century, the house was owned by Jean d'Aliès de Réalville (1683–1752), who was president of Montauban's Court of Aids. It then passed to Jean's son, Paul-Antoine d'Aliès de Réalville (1704–1787), who also became president of Montauban's Court of Aids. The building, by then known as the Hôtel d'Aliès de Cieurac, was sold in 1768, and after coming into the ownership of Madame de Bellissen, was sold to Monsieur de Limairac, prefect of Tarn-et-Garonne, in 1823.

The building then served as the bishop's palace. By that time, it was laid out as a typical hôtel particulier with a grand portal, a grand courtyard and two ornate façades. It was designed in the neoclassical style and built in red brick with ashlar stone dressings. There was a doorway in the centre of the main (southwest) façade and it was fenestrated with segmental headed windows on the ground and first floors and with square headed windows on the second floor. Internally, in addition to the main reception rooms, there was a chapel for the use of the bishop in one of the wings, erected to a design by Théodore Olivier in 1873.

This arrangement continued until 1906, when the Bishop of Montauban, Adolphe-Josué-Frédéric Fiard, was expelled from the palace, following the implementation of the 1905 French law on the Separation of the Churches and the State. The town council, which had previously been accommodated in a building further to the northwest along Rue de l'Hôtel de Ville, (Note: The building at No. 19, Rue de l'Hôtel de Ville had been commissioned by Pierre de Bertier in 1664. It served as the bishop's palace before the French Revolution, then became the town hall. Since 1908, it has accommodated the Musée Ingres Bourdelle.) relocated to the former Hôtel d'Aliès de Cieurac in 1908. The bishop's chapel was converted into the Salle de Mariages (wedding room), a clock was placed on the face of the building and the town's coat of arms was placed on the grand portal at that time.

The president of France Jacques Chirac visited the town hall and greeted the crowds there in March 2002. In July 2024, work commenced on the construction of a new administrative building with extensive new public reception areas, on a site behind the town hall, adjoining Grand Rue Sapiac. The new building, which is being built with terracotta facings at a cost of €15 million, is scheduled to be completed in late 2025.
