= Ans, Belgium =

City in Liège Province, Wallonia, Belgium

Ans Anse (Walloon)
- Municipality
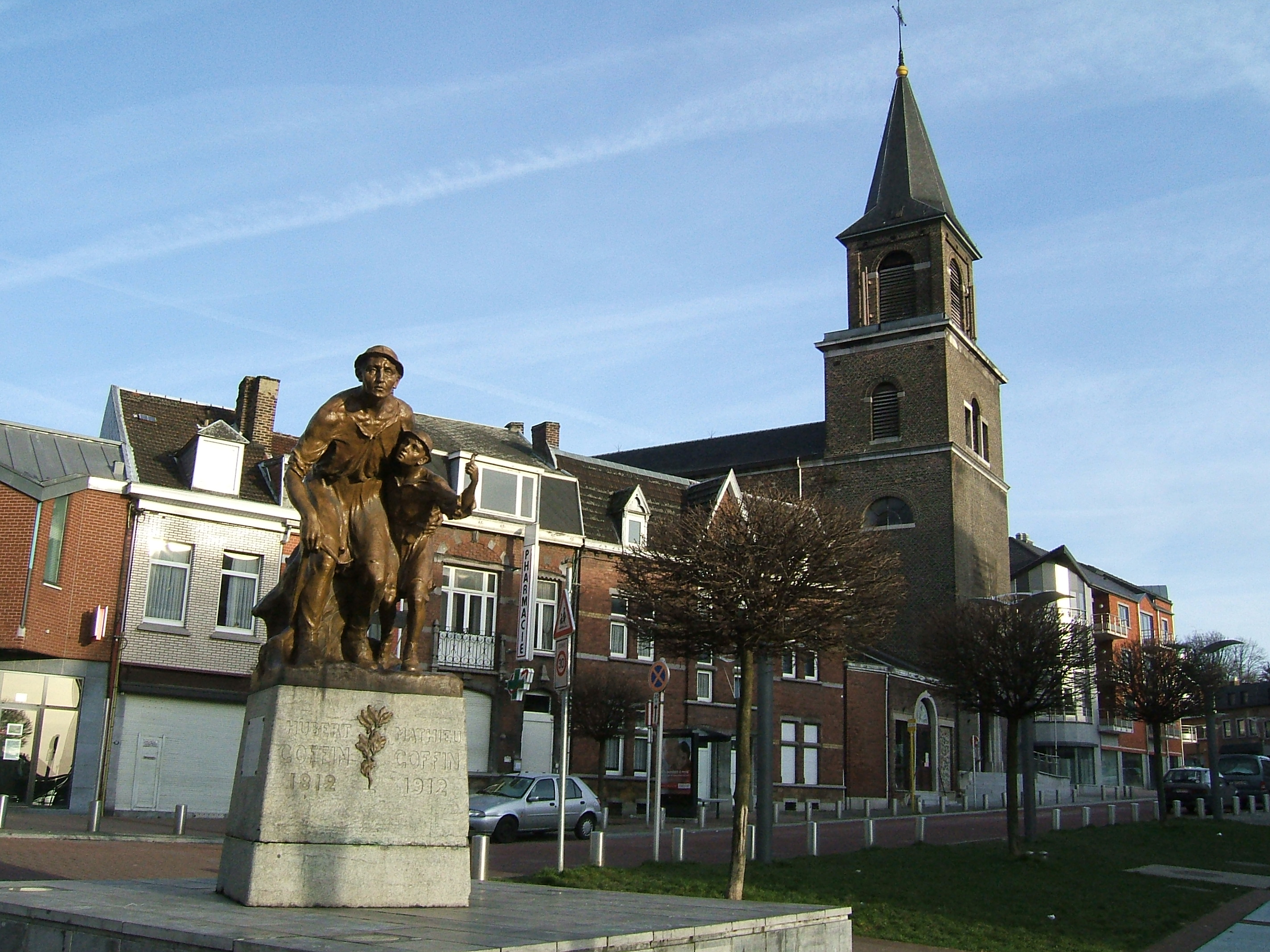
- Place Nicolai

- Flag Coat of arms

- Location of Ans in Liège
- Interactive map of Ans
- Location in Belgium
- Coordinates: 50°40′N 05°31′E
- Country: Belgium
- Community: French Community
- Region: Wallonia
- Province: Liège
- Arrondissement: Liège

Government
  - Mayor: Grégory Philippin (PS)
  - Governing party: PS - MR-IC - CDH-RCA

Area
  - Total: 23.35 km^{2} (9.02 sq mi)

Population (2018-01-01)
  - Total: 28,238
  - Density: 1,209/km^{2} (3,132/sq mi)
- Postal codes: 4430, 4431, 4432
- NIS code: 62003
- Area codes: 04
- Website: www.ans-commune.be

Ans (French pronunciation: [ɑ̃s]; Walloon: Anse) is a municipality and city of Wallonia located in the province of Liège, Belgium.

On January 1, 2006, Ans had a total population of 27,322. The total area is 23.35 km^{2} which gives a population density of 1,170 inhabitants per km^{2}. Its postal code is 4430.

Ans is the finish location of the road bicycle race Liège–Bastogne–Liège, the oldest of the classic cycle races, held every April.

Ans is bounded by Liège, Seraing, Herstal, Saint-Nicolas and Flémalle, forming the agglomeration of Liège with 600,000 people.

== Settlements ==
The municipality consists of the following districts:

- Ans
- Alleur (Walloon: Aleur)
- Loncin (Walloon: Loncén, other: Loncègn)
- Xhendremael (Walloon: Xhindmåle, other: Hin.n'mâle)

== Population ==
| Year | Population | Change | Density |
|---|---|---|---|
| 2002 | 27,587 | - | 1,173.91/km^{2} |
| 2004 | 27,397 | -190 or -0.68% | 1,173.20/km^{2} |
| 2006 | 27,322 | -75 or -0.27% | 1,170.10/km^{2} |

== Notable residents ==
- Léon Jeck (1947–2007), footballer, born in Ans
- Michel Daerden (1949–2012), politician, mayor of Ans 1993–2011
- Victor Larock (1904–1977), politician, born in Ans
- Annie Servais-Thysen (1933–2022), politician, born in Xhendremael, Ans

== Twinnings ==
Since 1999, Ans has been twinned with the Pays d'Ans association in Périgord. This association contains six municipalities linked to the historical lordship of Ans: Badefols-d'Ans, La Boissière-d'Ans, Chourgnac d’Ans, Granges-d'Ans, Sainte-Eulalie-d'Ans and Saint-Pantaly-d'Ans.

== See also ==
- List of protected heritage sites in Ans
