= La Bachellerie station =

Railway station in Saint-Rabier, France

Coordinates: 45°09′03″N 1°09′33″E

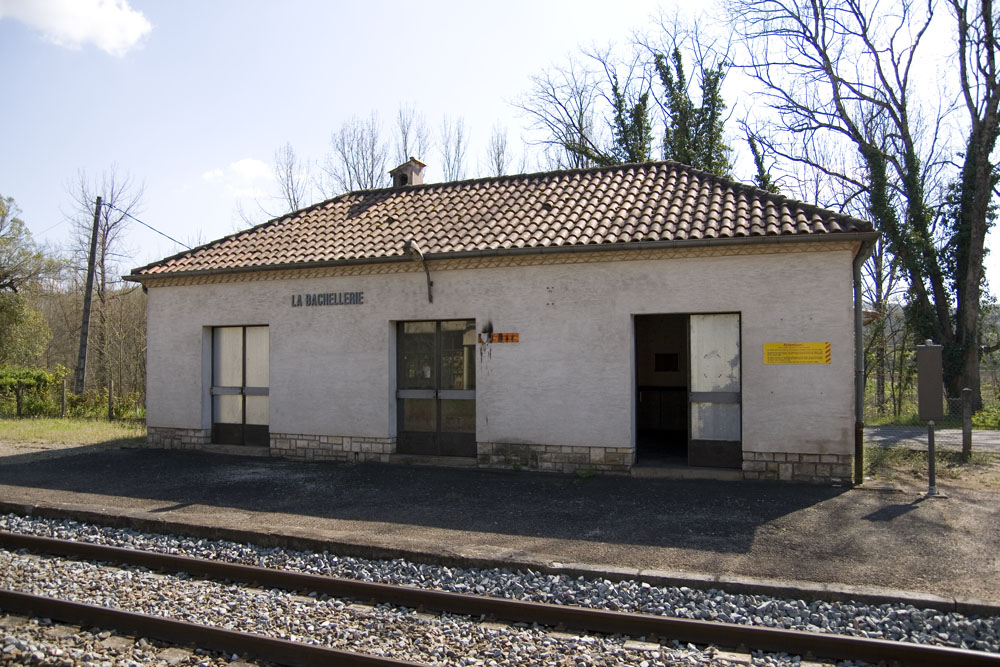
La Bachellerie station

La Bachellerie is a former railway station in La Bachellerie, Nouvelle-Aquitaine, France. The station is located on the Coutras - Tulle railway line. The station is served by TER Nouvelle-Aquitaine bus services on demand to Thenon and Condat-Le Lardin. Train services were suspended in 2020.
