= La Boissière-d'Ans =

- Part of Cubjac-Auvézère-Val d'Ans
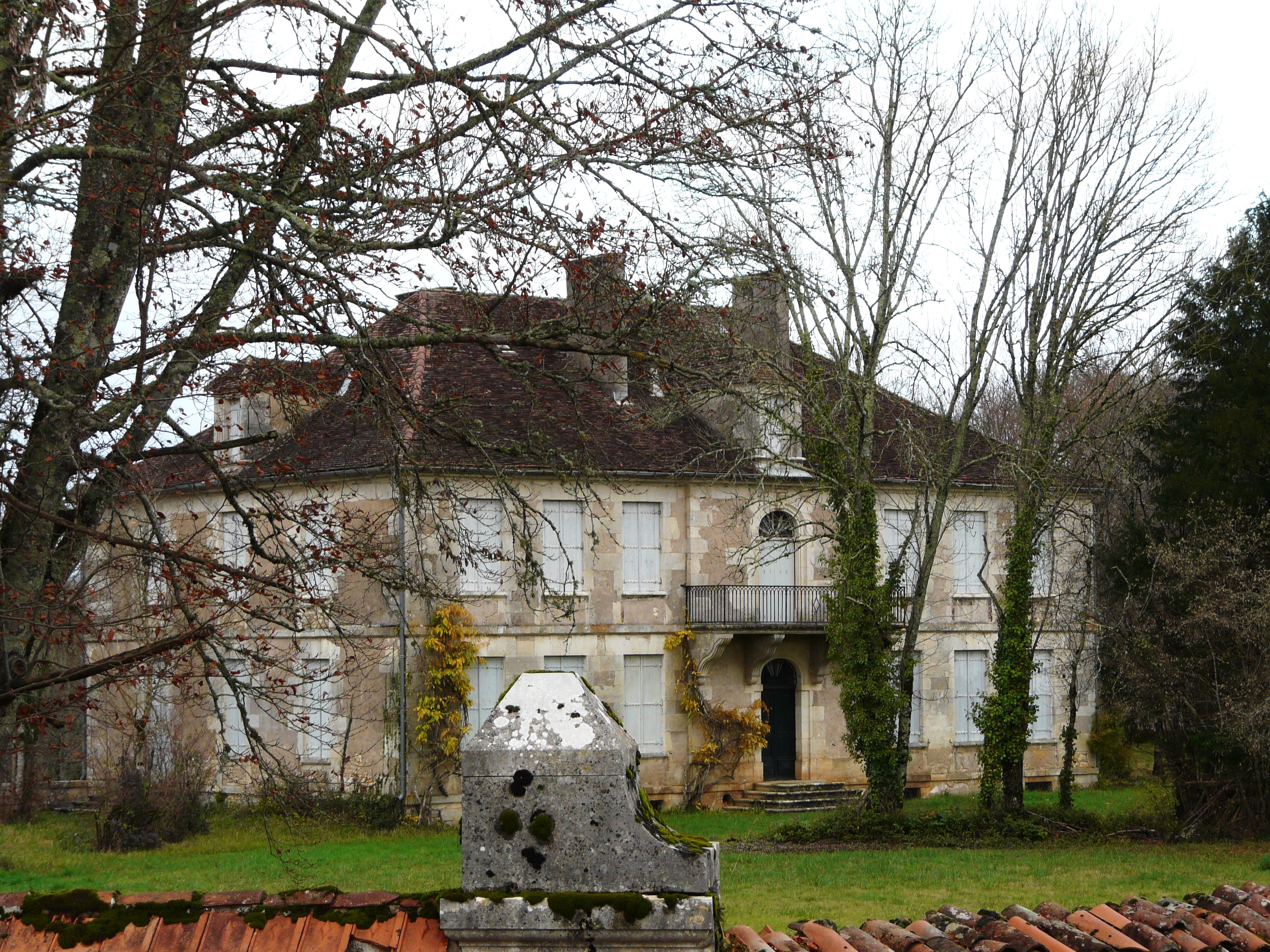
- Location of La Boissière-d'Ans
- Location within France Location within Nouvelle-Aquitaine
- Coordinates: 45°13′45″N 0°58′36″E
- Country: France
- Region: Nouvelle-Aquitaine
- Department: Dordogne
- Arrondissement: Nontron
- Canton: Isle-Loue-Auvézère
- Commune: Cubjac-Auvézère-Val d'Ans
- Area^{1}: 8.33 km^{2} (3.22 sq mi)
- Highest elevation: 256 m (840 ft)
- Lowest elevation: 112 m (367 ft)
- Population (2023): 247
  - Density: 29.7/km^{2} (76.8/sq mi)
- Time zone: UTC+01:00 (CET)
  - Summer (DST): UTC+02:00 (CEST)
- Postal code: 24640
- ^{1} French Land Register data, which excludes lakes, ponds, glaciers > 1 km^{2} (0.386 sq mi or 247 acres) and river estuaries.

La Boissière-d'Ans (French pronunciation: [la bwasjɛʁ dɑ̃s]; Occitan: La Boissiera d'Ans) is a former commune in the Dordogne department in southwestern France. On 1 January 2017, it was merged into the new commune Cubjac-Auvézère-Val d'Ans.

== Geography ==
Its principal river is the Blâme.

== International relations ==
La Boissière-d'Ans is twinned with:

- Ans, Belgium, since 1999

== See also ==
- Communes of the Dordogne département
