= Joseph Lachaud de Loqueyssie =

French politician

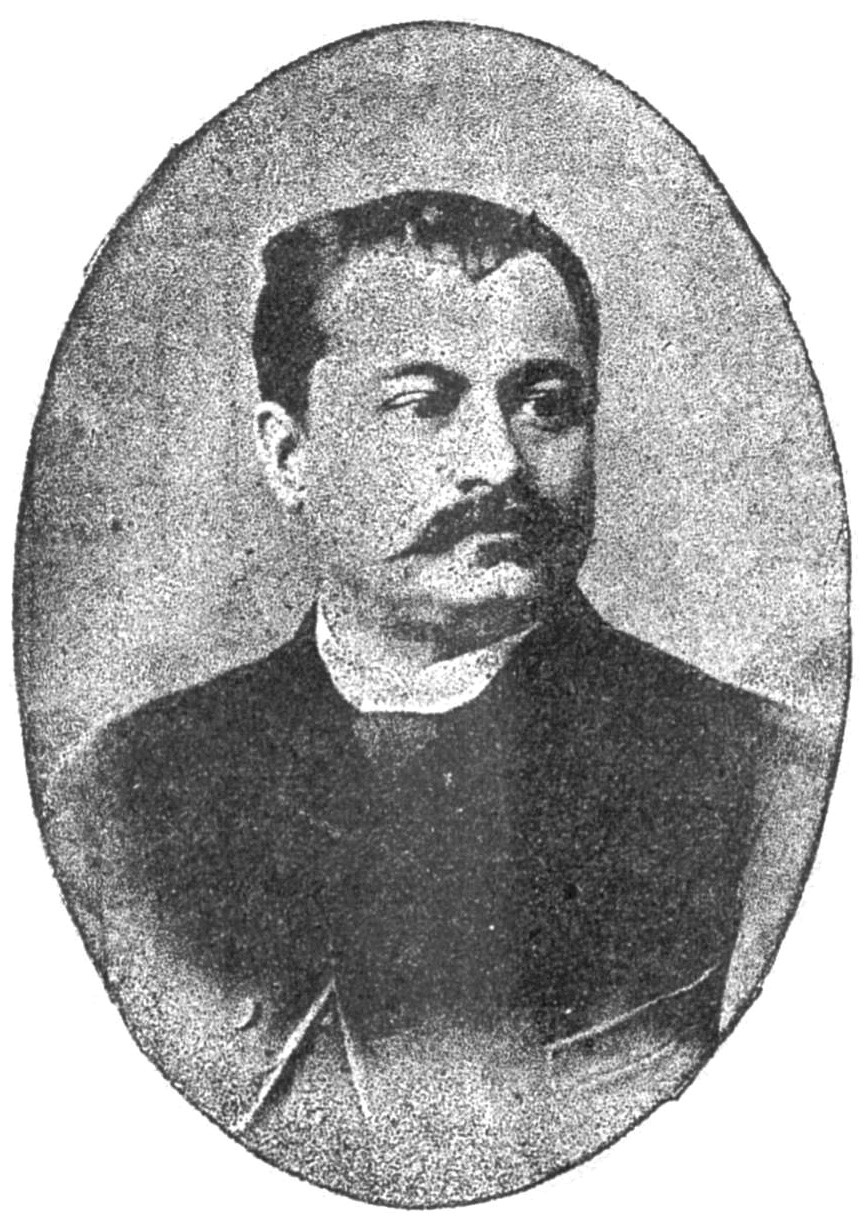

Deputy of Tarn-et-Garonne
- In office 14 October 1877 – 14 October 1881

Personal details
- Born: Joseph-Eugène-Albert de Lachaud de Loqueyssie; 1 October 1848 Montauban, Tarn-et-Garonne, France
- Died: 17 February 1896 (aged 47) Notre-Dame-de-Sanilhac, Dordogne, France
- Occupation: Politician

Joseph Lachaud de Loqueyssie (1 October 1848 – 17 February 1896) was a French politician who was deputy of Tarn-et-Garonne in 1877–81.

== Early years ==
Joseph-Eugène-Albert de Lachaud de Loqueyssie was born on 1 October 1848 in Montauban, Tarn-et-Garonne. His parents were Pierre Jules Lachaud de Loqueyssie (1815–1883) and Rose Françoise Prax. He was a captain in the Basses-Alpes Garde Mobile during the Franco-Prussian War, and on 26 November 1870 was wounded during the attack on Dijon. On 2 June 1872 in Granges-d'Ans he married Jeanne Johnston (1849–1921), the granddaughter of Georges Johnston. They had several children. He became the owner of his father-in-law's Château de Redon in Granges-d'Ans and the Château de Pouzelande in Notre-Dame-de-Sanilhac. After the death of his father-in-law, Eugene Gibiat, he directed the Pays and the Constitutionnel.

== Political career ==
Lachaud de Loqueyssie had Bonapartist political views. In the legislative elections of 23 April 1876 his uncle, Adrien Joseph Prax-Paris, ran for election in the first district of Montauban and encouraged him to run for election as a conservative in the second district of the same city. He lost by 5,981 to 6,487 for his opponent, Léon Pagès^{(fr)}. After the dissolution of the Chamber following the 16 May 1877 crisis he ran as the government candidate for the same seat and was elected. He joined the Appel au peuple parliamentary group and voted with the right. He ran for reelection on 21 August 1881 but was defeated by Léon Pagès, who won 5,853 votes to his 5,680. After this he retired from politics.

Joseph Lachaud de Loqueyssie died on 17 February 1896 at the age of 47 in Notre-Dame-de-Sanilhac, Dordogne.

== Sources ==
- Bashkirtseff, Marie (1879), "Livre 84", Journal Edition Integrale Sept 26 1877- Dec 21 1879 (in French), L'AGE D'HOMME, GGKEY:ZB90YT6PRDW
- d'Aurevilly, Jules Barbey (1980), Correspondance générale (in French), Presses Univ. Franche-Comté, ISBN 978-2-251-60381-0
- Jolly, Jean (1960–1977), "DE LACHAUD DE LOQUEYSSIE, JOSEPH, ALBERT", Dictionnaire des parlementaires français de 1889 à 1940 (in French), Paris: Éditeur : Presses universitaires de France, ISBN 2-1100-1998-0
- Joseph, Albert de Lachaud de Loqueyssie (in French), Assemblée nationale
- Pierfit, "Albert LACHAUD de LOQUEYSSIE", geneanet (in French)
- Robert, Adolphe; Cougny, Gaston (1889–1891), "LACHAUD DE LOQUEYSSIE(JOSEPH ALBERT DE)", in Edgar Bourloton (ed.), Dictionnaire des Parlementaires français (1789–1889) (in French)
- Roubinet, Cyril, "Albert LACHAUD de LOQUEYSSIE", geneanet (in French)
