= Saint-Pantaly-d'Ans =

- Part of Cubjac-Auvézère-Val d'Ans
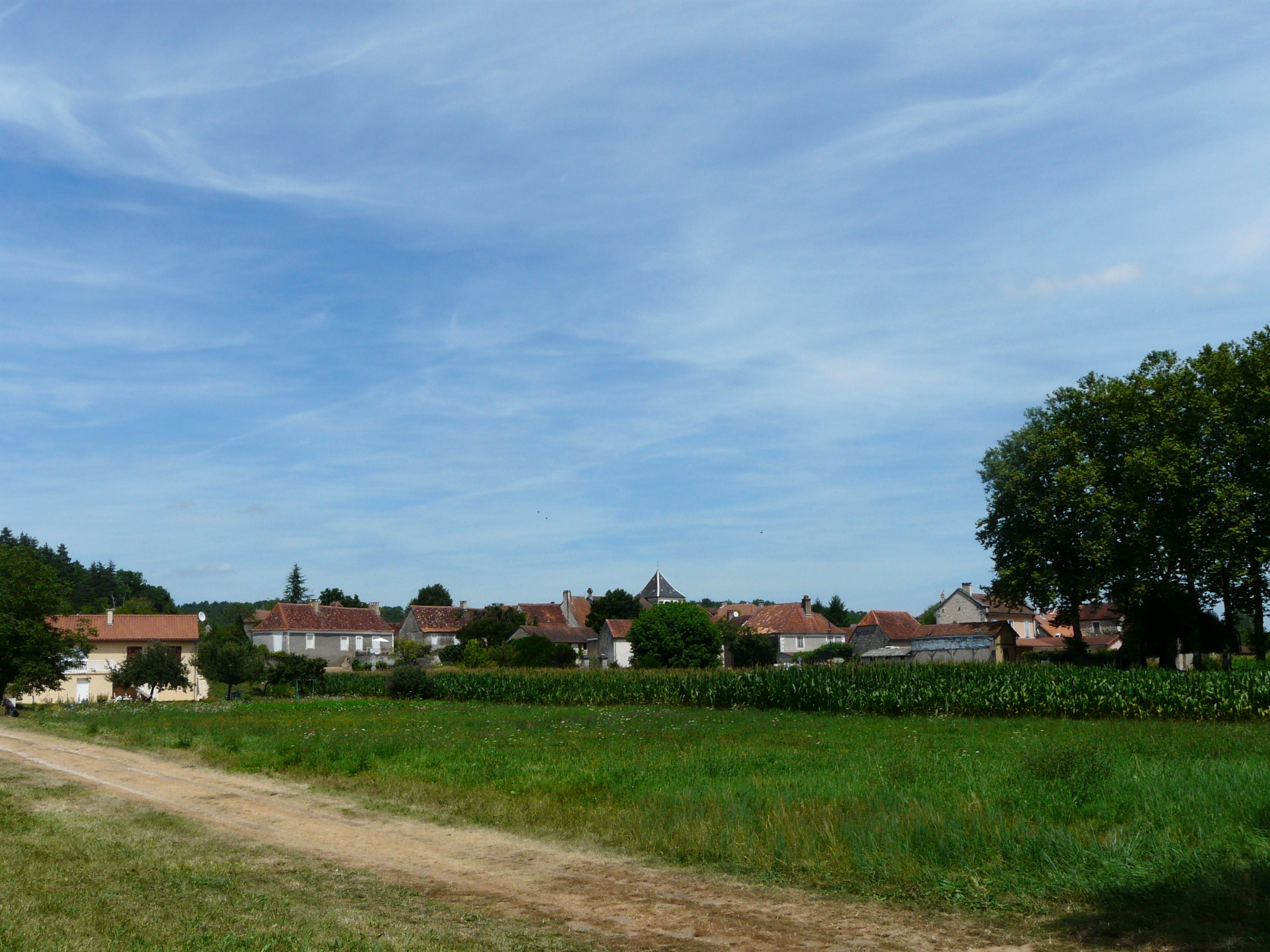
- Location of Saint-Pantaly-d'Ans
- Location within France Location within Nouvelle-Aquitaine
- Coordinates: 45°14′33″N 0°59′48″E
- Country: France
- Region: Nouvelle-Aquitaine
- Department: Dordogne
- Arrondissement: Périgueux
- Canton: Isle-Loue-Auvézère
- Commune: Cubjac-Auvézère-Val d'Ans
- Area^{1}: 10.61 km^{2} (4.10 sq mi)
- Elevation: 126 m (413 ft)
- Highest elevation: 258 m (846 ft)
- Lowest elevation: 114 m (374 ft)
- Population (2023): 149
  - Density: 14.0/km^{2} (36.4/sq mi)
- Time zone: UTC+01:00 (CET)
  - Summer (DST): UTC+02:00 (CEST)
- Postal code: 24640
- ^{1} French Land Register data, which excludes lakes, ponds, glaciers > 1 km^{2} (0.386 sq mi or 247 acres) and river estuaries.

Saint-Pantaly-d'Ans (French pronunciation: [sɛ̃ pɑ̃tali dɑ̃s]; Limousin: Sent Pantali d'Ans) is a former commune in the Dordogne department in Nouvelle-Aquitaine in southwestern France. On 1 January 2017, it was merged into the new commune Cubjac-Auvézère-Val d'Ans.

== See also ==
- Communes of the Dordogne department
