= Cognac Gautier =

French cognac distillery

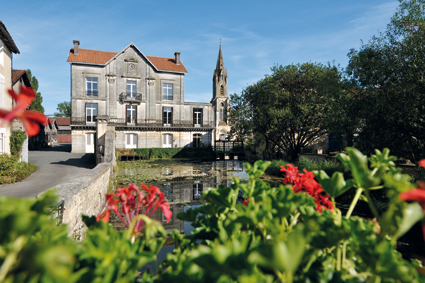
- Maison Gautier
- Industry: Alcoholic beverages
- Founded: 1755
- Founder: Charles Gautier
- Headquarters: Aigre, France
- Products: Cognac
- Parent: Marie Brizard Wine & Spirits
- Website: cognac-gautier.com

La Maison Gautier, more commonly known as Cognac Gautier, is a French cognac distillery. It is part of the Marie Brizard Wine & Spirits group. Founded in 1755, it is one of the oldest French cognac manufacturers.

The cellars of Maison Gautier were established in an old water mill in Aigre on the Osme river, in Charente, when the family obtained a royal warrant to produce cognac and a founding charter signed by King Louis XV.

== History ==
The Gautier family gained fame in the 16th century when they made casks using wood from the Tronçais forest, famous for the quality of its oaks.

In 1644, Charles Gautier married Jacquette Brochet, a winemaker's daughter. From 1700, their grandson, Louis Gautier, developed the trade in cognac. He helped expand the market and contributed to the considerable growth of Maison Gautier.

In 1755, the family obtained a royal warrant to produce cognac and a founding charter signed by King Louis XV. Maison Gautier was born, and the winery was installed in the former watermill in Aigre.

The heirs of Maison Gautier succeeded each other in turn over 10 generations, developing the family business.

In 1995, Gautier joined the group Marie Brizard & Roger International, which was in turn purchased by the Belvedere Group in 2006 and renamed Marie Brizard Wine & Spirits.

In November 2015, a bottle of Gautier cognac, appraised and dated to 1762, was bought at auction for US$59,500 by a group of Polish collectors, who shared this exceptional bottle. It is considered to be the oldest bottle of cognac.
