= Ambérac =

- Commune
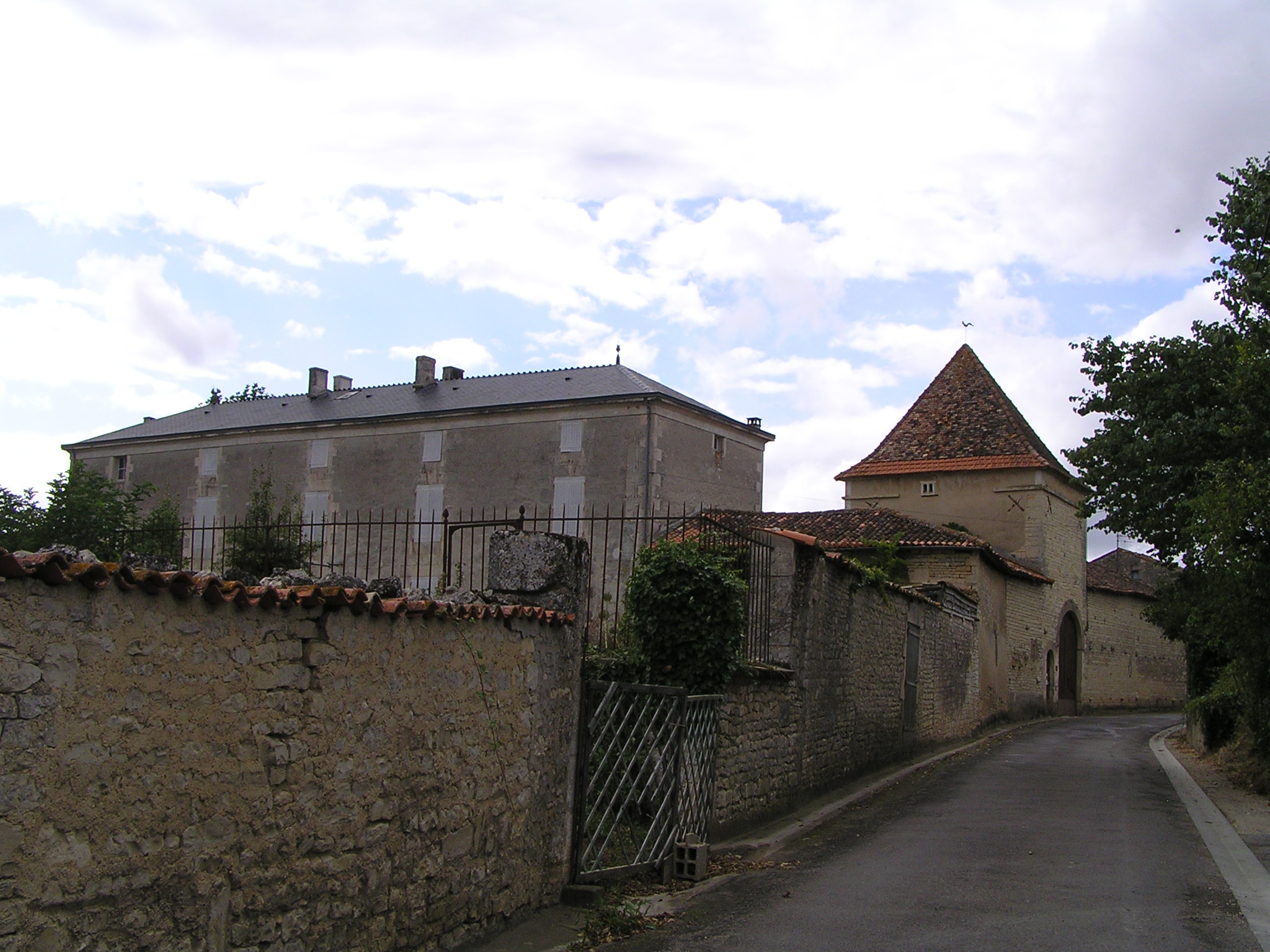
- Pigeon House
- Location of Ambérac
- Location within France Location within Nouvelle-Aquitaine
- Coordinates: 45°51′14″N 0°03′58″E
- Country: France
- Region: Nouvelle-Aquitaine
- Department: Charente
- Arrondissement: Confolens
- Canton: Boixe-et-Manslois
- Intercommunality: Cœur de Charente

Government
  - Mayor (2020–2026): Alain Combaud
- Area^{1}: 12.10 km^{2} (4.67 sq mi)
- Elevation: 78 m (256 ft)
- Highest elevation: 101 m (331 ft)
- Lowest elevation: 46 m (151 ft)
- Population (2023): 315
  - Density: 26.0/km^{2} (67.4/sq mi)
- Time zone: UTC+01:00 (CET)
  - Summer (DST): UTC+02:00 (CEST)
- INSEE/Postal code: 16008 /16140
- ^{1} French Land Register data, which excludes lakes, ponds, glaciers > 1 km^{2} (0.386 sq mi or 247 acres) and river estuaries.

Ambérac (French pronunciation: [ɑ̃beʁak]) is a commune in the Charente département, region in the Nouvelle-Aquitaine region of southwestern France.

== Geography ==
Ambérac is in the north-west part of the Charente department some 24 km north by north-west of Angouleme, 6 km south-east of Aigre, and 8 kilometres north-west of Saint-Amant-de-Boixe. Access to the commune is by the D88 road from Aigre in the north-west which passes through the village and continues south-east to Xambes. The D69 road also comes from Marcillac-Lanville in the west to the village then continues east to Villognon. There are a number of hamlets in the commune apart from the village.

The nearest railway station is that of Luxé, 5 km to the north-east which is served by a TER service to Angoulême, Poitiers, and Bordeaux.

=== Hamlets and localities ===
North-west of the town along the Aume and the Route d'Aigre there are a few hamlets: les Picots, les Citres, les Marais; and some farms: le Cambouil, les Thibauds, and le Goyaud. To the east, on the road to Mansle, there is Les Granges.

=== Geology and relief ===
The commune sits on a limestone bedrock dating from the Upper Jurassic (Kimmeridgian). Alluvium dated from the Quaternary period cover the alluvial valleys of the Aume and Charente, the most recent being on the floodplain. There are also some areas of Sand on the slopes dating to the Quaternary glaciations.

The relief of the commune is that of a low plateau and a confluence of two valleys. The highest point in the commune is at an altitude of 101 m located on the western boundary. The lowest point is 46 m located along the Charente on the south-western boundary. The town was built on the banks of the river at 62 m above sea level.

=== Hydrography ===
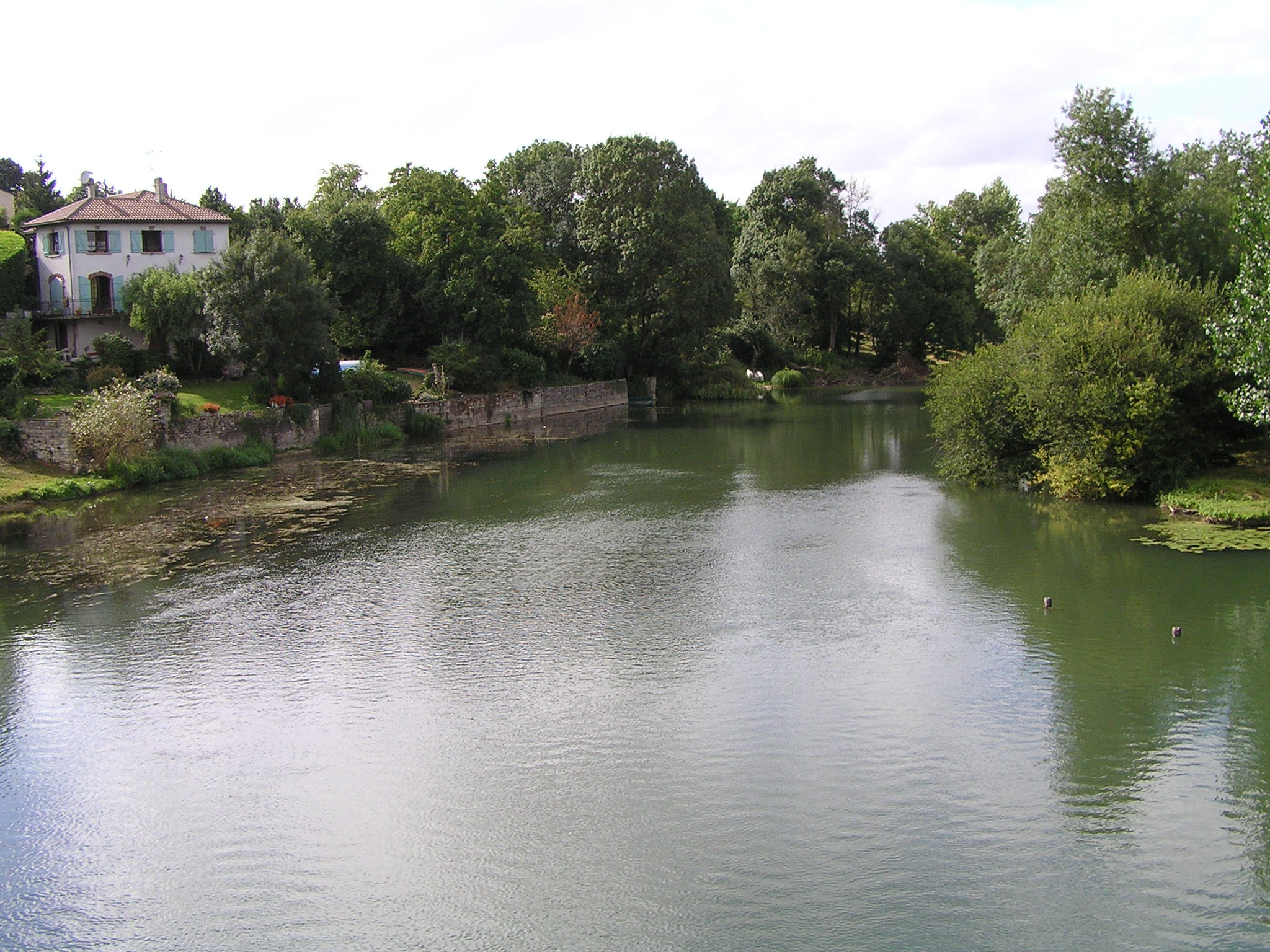
The Charente at Ambérac

The Charente traverses the commune downstream from Mansle and upstream from Angouleme. The village is built on the right bank and downstream of the confluence of the Aume, which flows north of the town. The Aume rises at Bouin, Deux-Sèvres, and passes through Aigre.

=== Climate ===
As in the three-quarters in the south and west of the department, the climate is oceanic Aquitaine.

== Toponymy ==
The place was attested in the forms Amberaco from 1080 to 1117, then Ambariaco from 1274 to 1297.

It is a Gallic or Gallo-Roman toponymic form based on the suffix -acum, either from the Gallic *-AKO or the Gallo-Roman -ACU.

== History ==
The town was inhabited as least as early as Roman times, as attested to by artifacts found in and round the commune such as a bronze likeness of Mercury wearing a winged petasos, stone slabs engraved with oculi found on the Amberac plain; a stone slab with an oculus and coins from the eras of Augustus, Marcus Aurelius, and Maximin found in the Rue du bourg. Also found in the village have been fragments of lamps, digging tools, a vase made with grey clay, other iron objects, and fragments of a mosaic.

A circular oven 1.50 m in diameter located near Granges together with pottery, tiles and bricks found in the same field date from the same period.

In a nearby location, known as La Tour-des-Fades, the remains of an ancient building were also discovered with rows of bricks and a vaulted gallery, the details of which are listed in La Statistique Monumentale de la Charente

Ambérac was built near the ancient city of Oliba, and was a fiefdom of the La Rochefoucauld and Marcillac families. It was an archdiocese until the Revolution.

It is mentioned for the first time as having an archpriest around 1035 for the parish of Saint-Stephen of Ambérac, a perpetual vicariate which was given by the counts of Angoulême to the Abbey of Saint-Amand de Boixe. Shortly after this founding there was an obedience in 1080. Bishop Girard II confirmed this gift in 1117 but assigned an annual fee of 5 sols, payable on the feast of Saint-Hilaire. In 1146, the prior of Lanville, who already had some rights, demanded and got upon retirement 10 sols per year in favour of the Abbey.

Since then, it has consistently remained dependent on the convent priory of Augustine de Lanville.

The village of Ville-Babou was probably built by one of the two Babou's who were Bishops of Angoulême in the 16th century.

An underground shelter was discovered in 1925.

== Administration ==
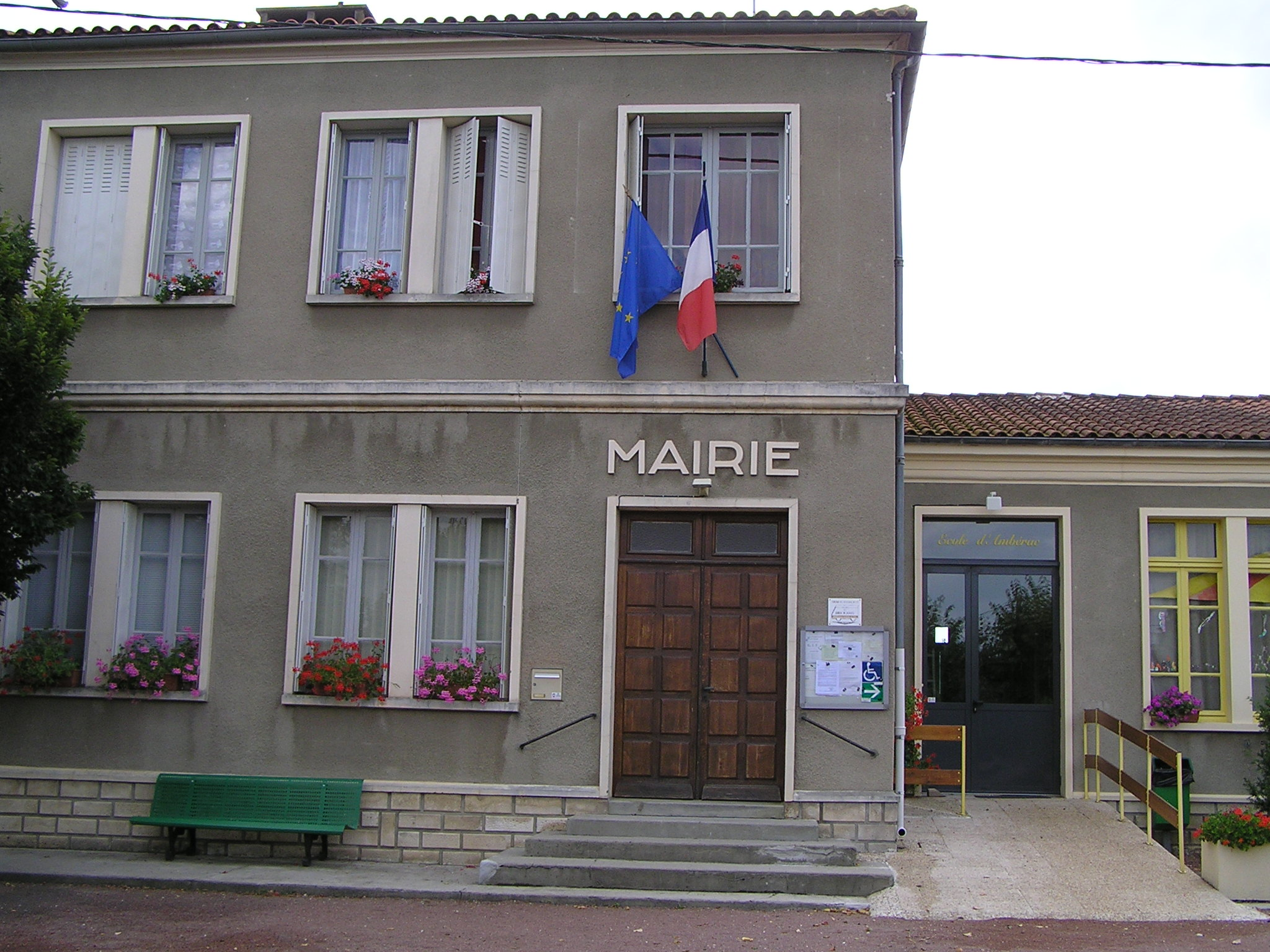
The Town Hall

Created as Embérac in the Canton of Lanville Marcillac in 1793, it became Ambeirac in the canton of Saint-Amand-de-Boixe in 1801 then Ambérac.

List of Successive Mayors

| From | To | Name | Party | Position |
|---|---|---|---|---|
| 2001 | 2026 | Alain Combaud | ind. | Public works technician |

== Population ==
The inhabitants of the commune are known as Ambéracois or Ambéracoises in French.

Historical population
| Year | Pop. | ±% p.a. |
|---|---|---|
| 1968 | 317 | — |
| 1975 | 330 | +0.58% |
| 1982 | 361 | +1.29% |
| 1990 | 338 | −0.82% |
| 1999 | 337 | −0.03% |
| 2007 | 314 | −0.88% |
| 2012 | 333 | +1.18% |
| 2017 | 319 | −0.86% |
| 2023 | 315 | −0.21% |
Source: INSEE

== Equipment, services and local life ==
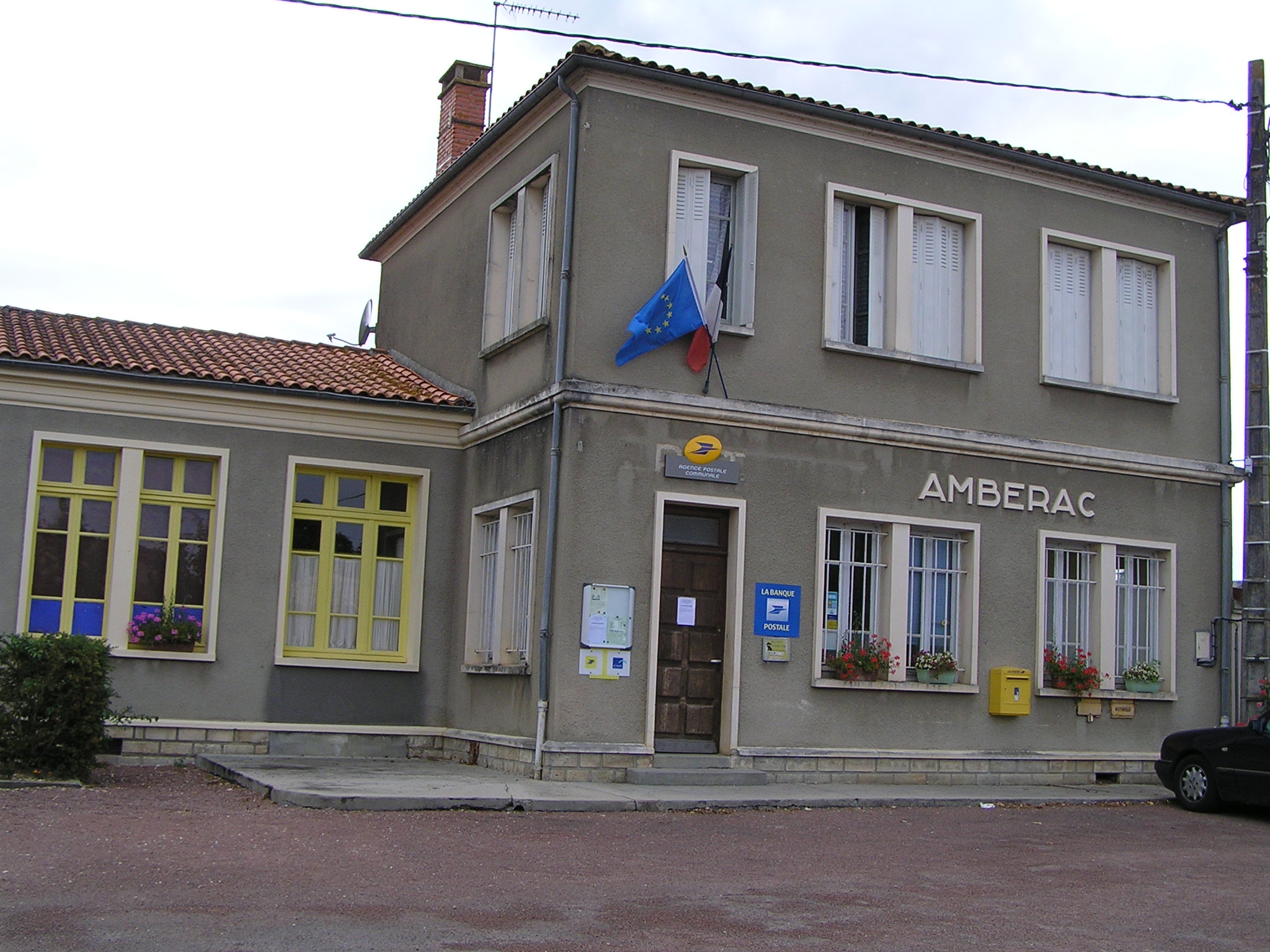
The Post Office

=== Education ===
The school is an intercommunal educational group between Ambérac and Marcillac-Lanville. Marcillac-Lanville has an elementary school and Ambérac has a primary school.

== Sites and monuments ==
=== Civil heritage ===
- The underground Gallo-Roman remains
- A Rural heritage of fountains and houses some of which are very old.
- The Mill at Brissac is the only remaining one of the many that operated in the 18th century.
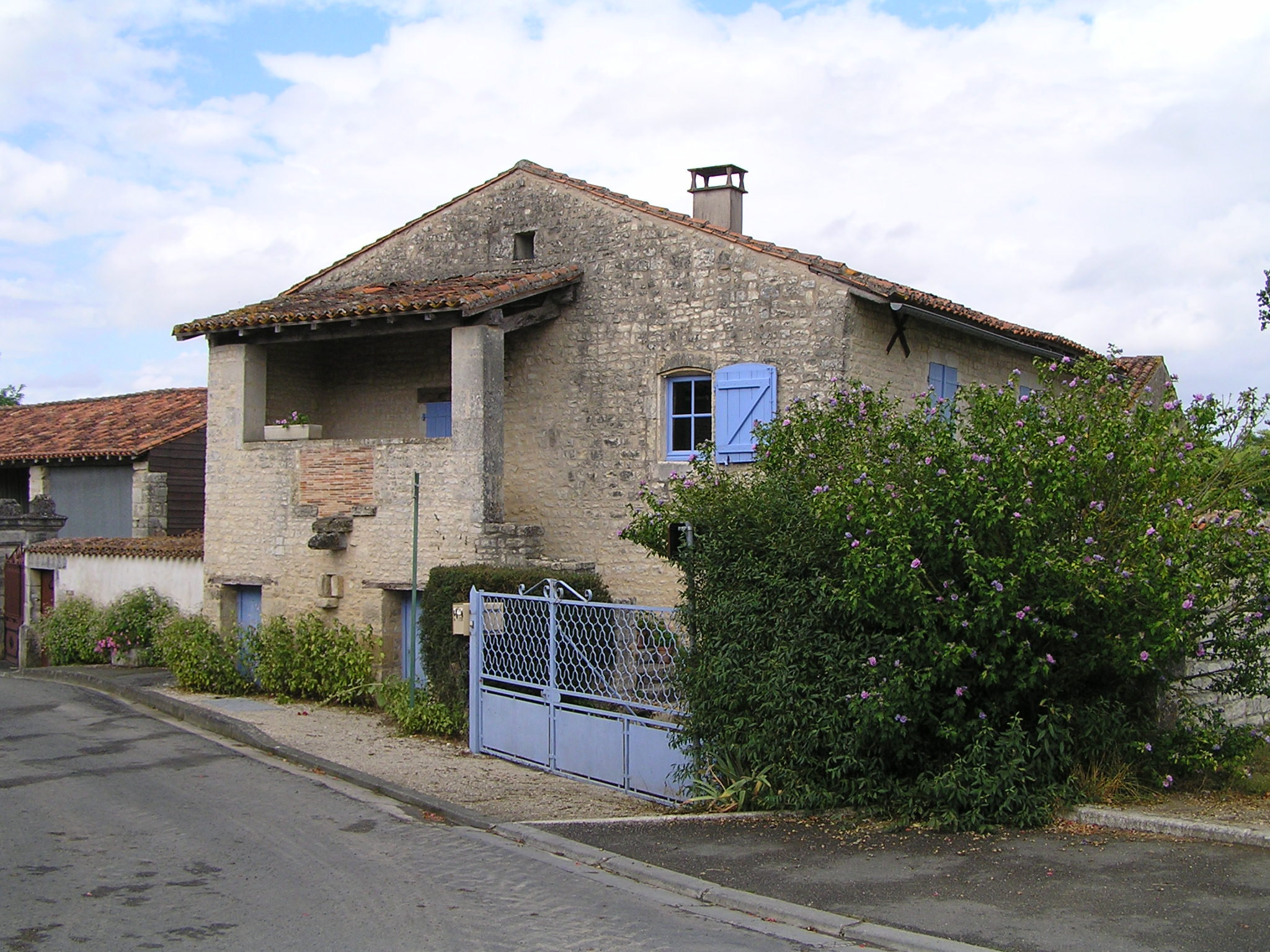
House with Balet

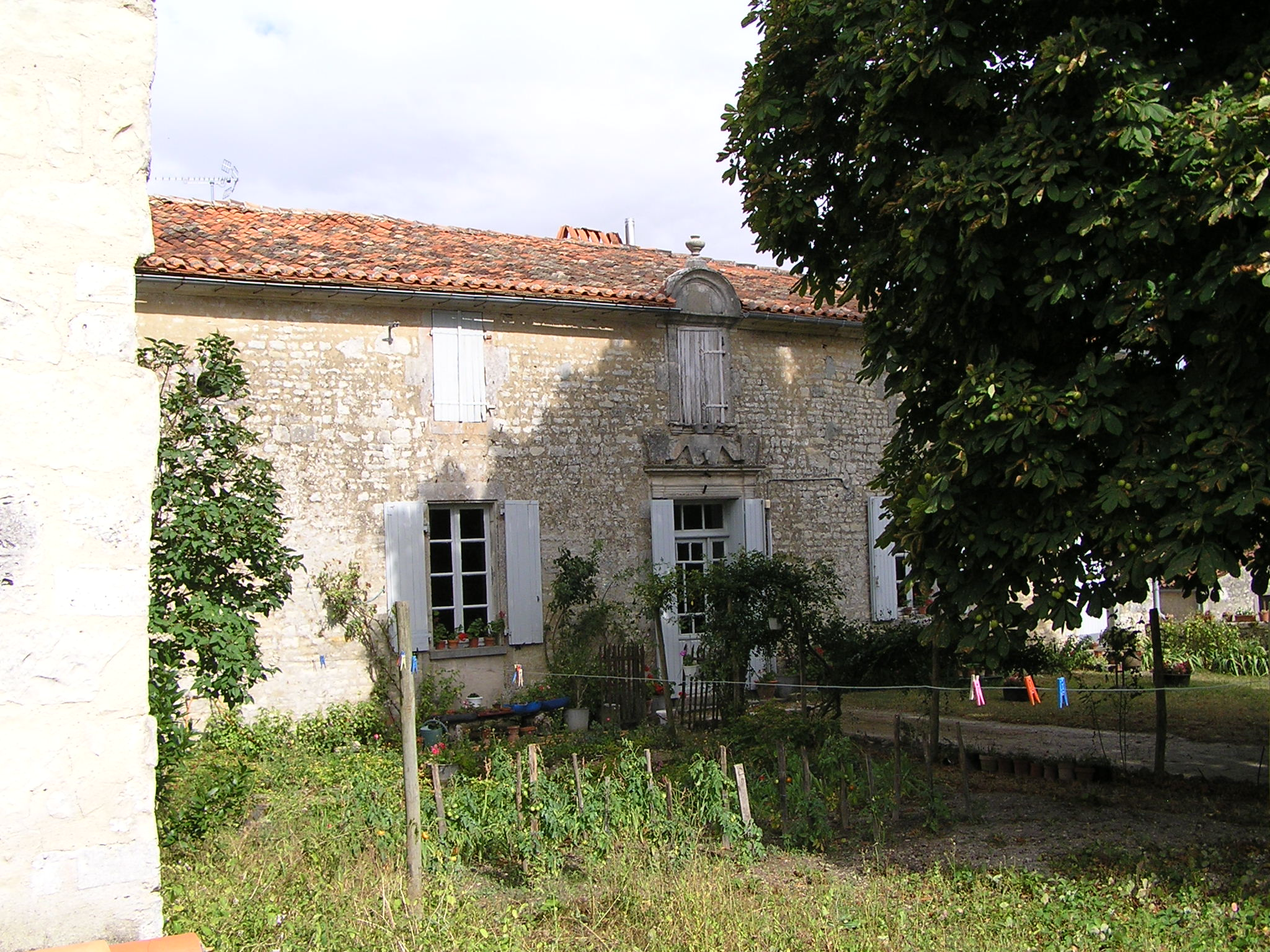
Old rectory next to the church

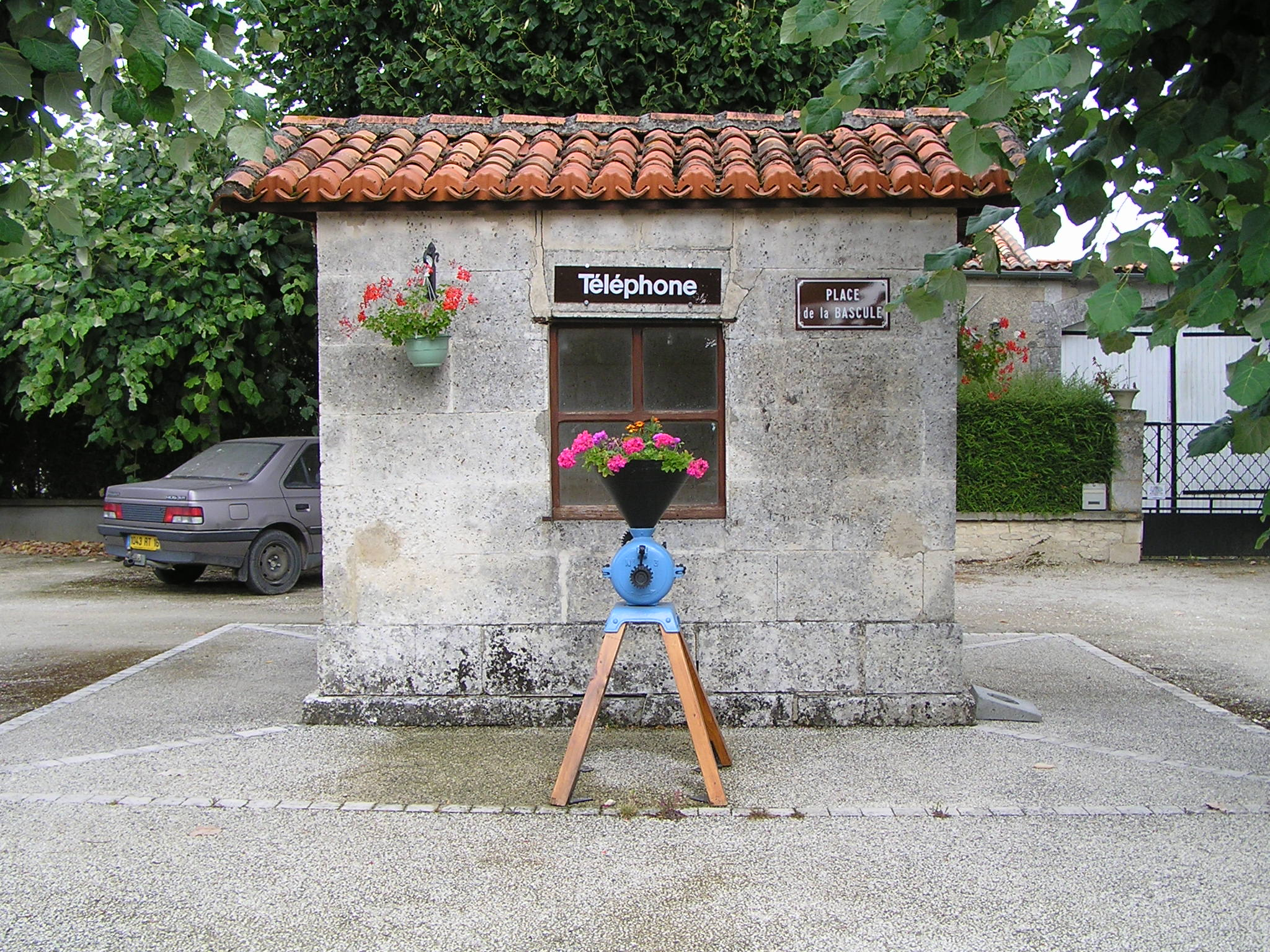
Weigh house

=== Religious heritage ===
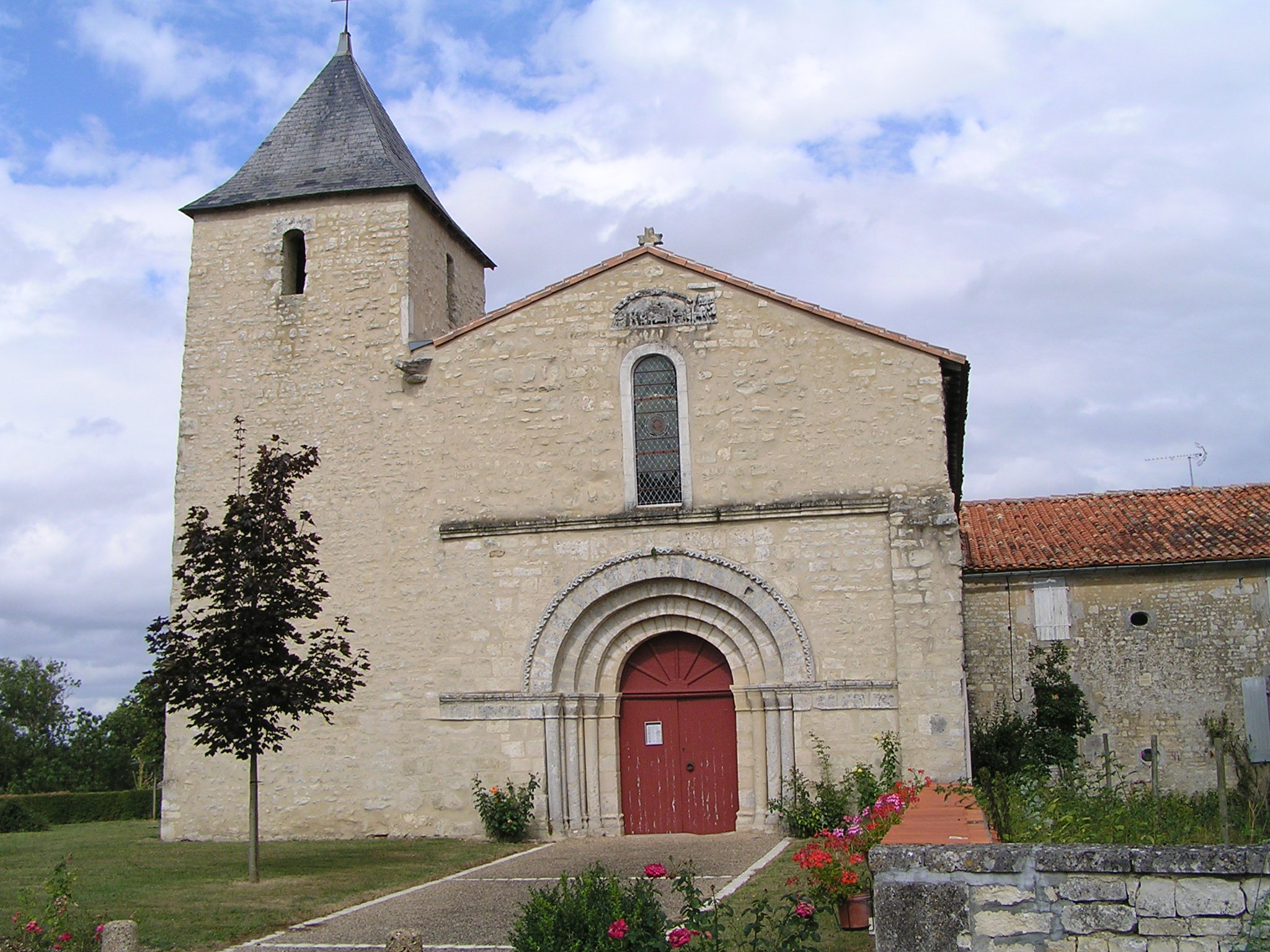
The church of Saint-Etienne

The Parish Church of Saint-Etienne dates from the 12th century. It was one of the 13 archpriests of Angoumois. The church contains several items that are registered as historical objects:

- A Bronze Bell (1773)
- 4 bas-reliefs: the Annunciation, the Visitation, the Nativity, and the Magi (12th century)
- An Iron die for Sacramental bread (14th century)

The church also has an Harmonium which was renovated in July 2013.

=== Environmental heritage ===
The banks of the Charente and the Aume are Natura 2000 zones.

== Notable people linked to the commune ==
- André Savignon, born in Tarbes on 1 January 1878, a French journalist and writer, married Berthe Desgranges on 27 September 1919 at Ambérac.
- Louis Vatrican, born in Monaco on 7 May 1904, an agricultural engineer, director of the Exotic Garden of Monaco, married Suzanne Magnant on 5 May 1928 at Ambérac.

== See also ==
- Communes of the Charente department
