= Louis Gautier =

French politician

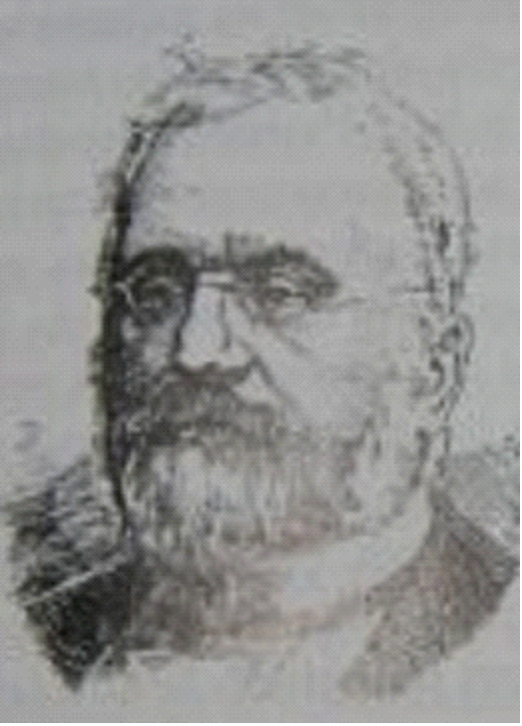

Deputy for Charente
- In office 5 March 1876 – 15 November 1879

Personal details
- Born: 22 January 1810 Aigre, Charente, France
- Died: 26 January 1884 (aged 74) Fouqueure, Charente, France
- Occupation: Politician

Louis Gautier (22 January 1810 – 26 January 1884) was a French Bonapartist politician who was a deputy for Charente during the French Third Republic.

== Life ==
Louis Gautier was born on 22 January 1810 in Aigre, Charente. He became an eau de vie merchant in Aigre, and a Charente district councilor. He was allied with the André family of Charente and shared their Bonapartist sympathies, which helped him enter politics. He did not run for election to the legislature until the general elections of 1876.

Gautier was elected Deputy of Charent on 5 March 1876 and took his seat with the Appel au peuple parliamentary group. He did not take part in debates, but voted regularly with the conservative minority. He voted for the government in the 16 May 1877 crisis. After the Chamber was dissolved he was reelected as a Bonapartist and as official candidate on 14 October 1877, and again sat with the Bonapartists of the right. He resigned as deputy on 15 November 1879. His son, René François Gautier, was elected in his place on 29 February 1880.

Louis Gautier died on 26 January 1884 in Fouqueure, Charente.

== Sources ==
- Louis Gautier (in French), Assemblée nationale
- Robert, Adolphe; Cougny, Gaston (1889–1891), "GAUTIER (LOUIS)", in Edgar Bourloton (ed.), Dictionnaire des Parlementaires français (1789–1889) (in French)
