= Louis Gustave Chauveaud =

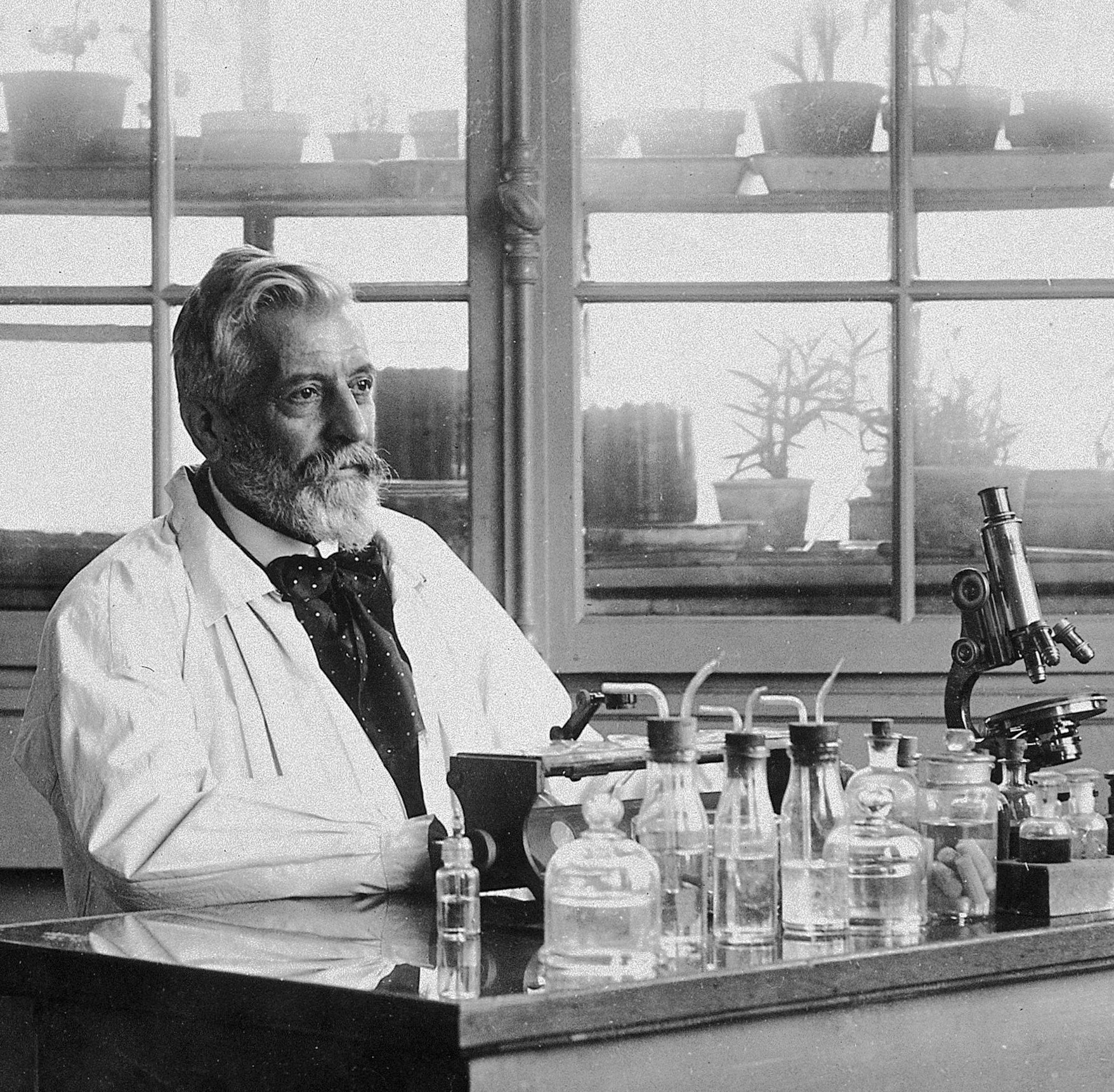
Louis Gustave Chauveaud

Louis Gustave Chauveaud (12 December 1859 in Aigre – 1933 in Paris) was a French botanist, known for his studies of plant anatomy.

From 1890 to 1895 he was associated with work done in the laboratory of botany at the École pratique des Hautes Études in Paris. In 1888 he received his agrégation for natural sciences, followed by doctorates in sciences (1891) and medicine (1892). For thirty years he served as director of the botanical laboratory at the Faculty of Sciences in Paris. During this time, he also taught classes at the Sorbonne.

In 1928 he was appointed president of the Société botanique de France. The plant species Sedum chauveaudii (Raym.-Hamet) commemorates his name.

== Principal works ==
- Recherches embryogéniques sur l'appareil laticifère des euphorbiacées, urticacées, apocynées et asclépiadées, 1891 – Research on embryogenic laticifers of Euphorbiaceae, Urticaceae, Apocynaceae and Asclepiadoideae.
- La constitution des plantes vasculaires révélée par leur ontogénie, 1921 – The formation of vascular plants revealed by their ontogeny.
