= Marie Brizard Wine & Spirits =

French wine and spirits company

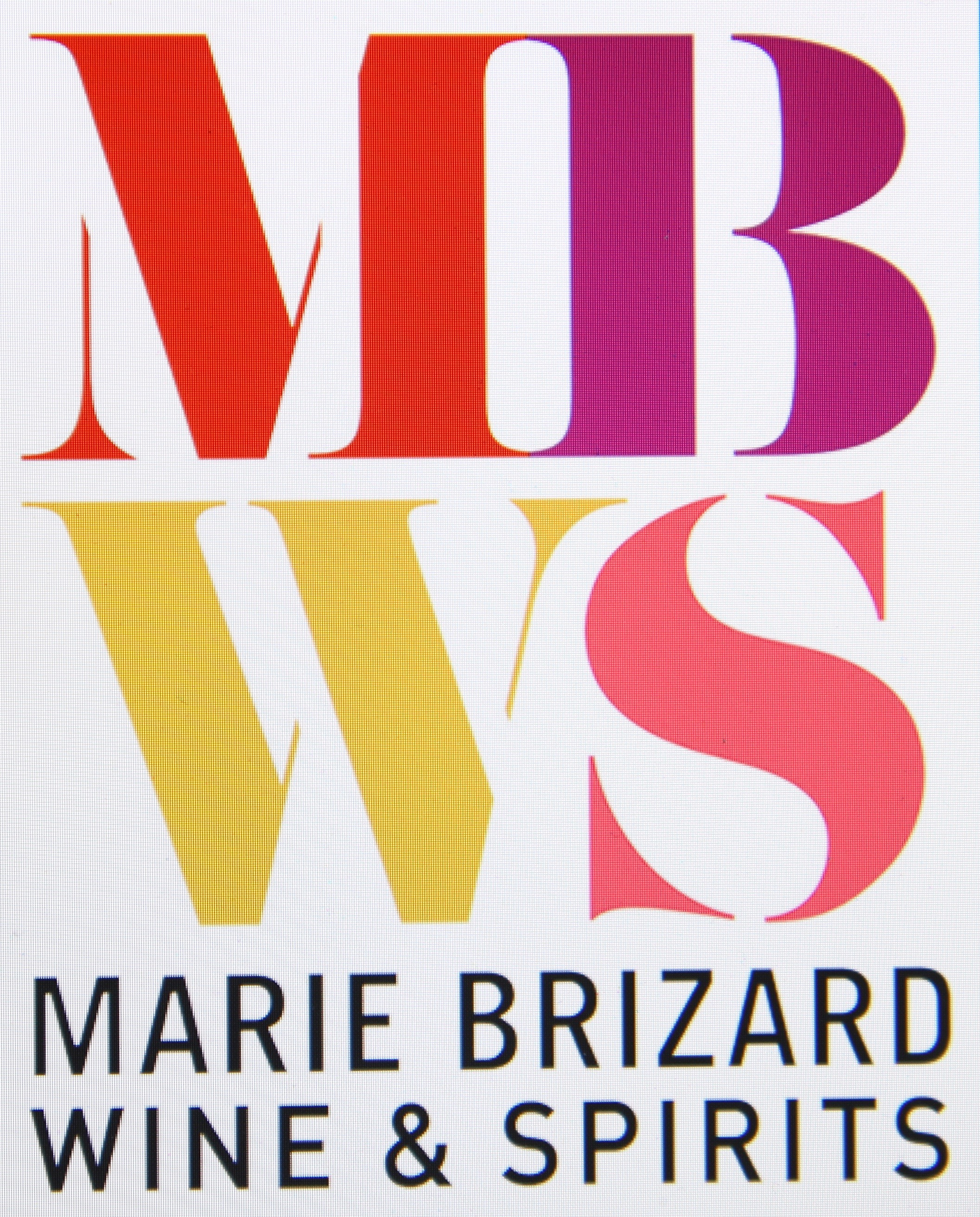
- Traded as: CAC All-Share

Marie Brizard Wine & Spirits (Euronext Paris: MBWS ) is a French wine and spirits producer and distributor. The company was founded in 1991. It is listed on the French stock market, and is a member of the CAC Small 90 index. The recipes of its most famous liquor, "Anisette", was created in 1755.

== Activities ==
The company operates primarily in France, Poland, and in the United States, producing and distributing a range of wines and spirits, such as the vodka brands Sobieski and Krupnik, the whisky William Peel, the liquor range Marie Brizard, Cognac Gautier, and the tequila San Jose. It also owns a wide range of wines, including Moncigale, Marques del Puerto, and the flavoured wine brand Fruits & Wine.

== Shareholders ==
As of March 22, 2018, the largest shareholders of the company are:
Cofepp : 29.47%
Diana holding : 13.90%
Schroder IM : 4.98%
DF Holding : 4.94%
Others : 46.71%

== See also ==
- Marie Brizard et Roger International
