= Sobieski (vodka) =

Polish vodka brand

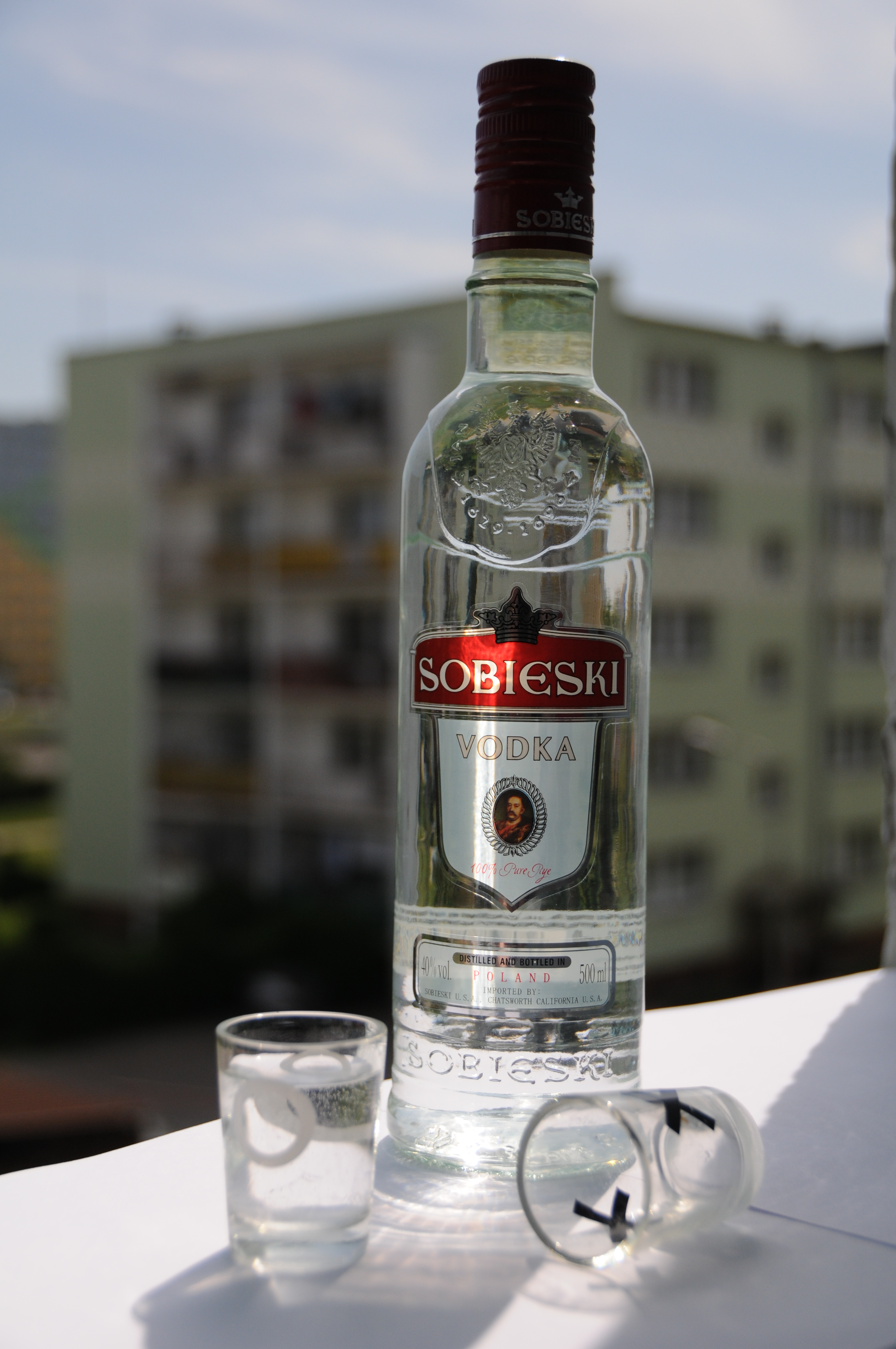
- Type: Vodka
- Manufacturer: Distillery Sobieski S.A.
- Distributor: Sobieski Sp. z o.o.(Poland); Imperial Brands (USA)
- Origin: Poland
- Alcohol by volume: 40%
- Related products: List of vodkas
- Website: sobieskivodka.com

Sobieski is a Polish vodka brand. The company is currently a property of United Beverages Group.

Sobieski is named after Jan III Sobieski, king of the Polish–Lithuanian Commonwealth from 1674 to 1696. His nickname is the "Lion of Lechistan."

Sobieski's basic vodka is a 100% pure rye vodka. It is distilled in Poland with rye (cultivar Dankowski) and water only. Sobieski also produces four flavored vodkas made from fruit juice: Raspberry, Lemon, Orange, and Vanilla. Two vodka-based liqueurs are also produced by the label: Strawberry and Caramel.

The Sobieski company was founded in 1846 by H.A. Winkelhausen in Koniaków, and produced over 60 types of alcohol. Following World War II, the Koniaków distillery was rebuilt and consolidated under the state monopoly on Vodka production. In 2003, Production moved to Starogard Gdański.

In 2009, American actor Bruce Willis signed a contract to become the international face of Belvedere SA's Sobieski Vodka in exchange for 3.3% ownership in the company.
