= Aigre =

- Commune
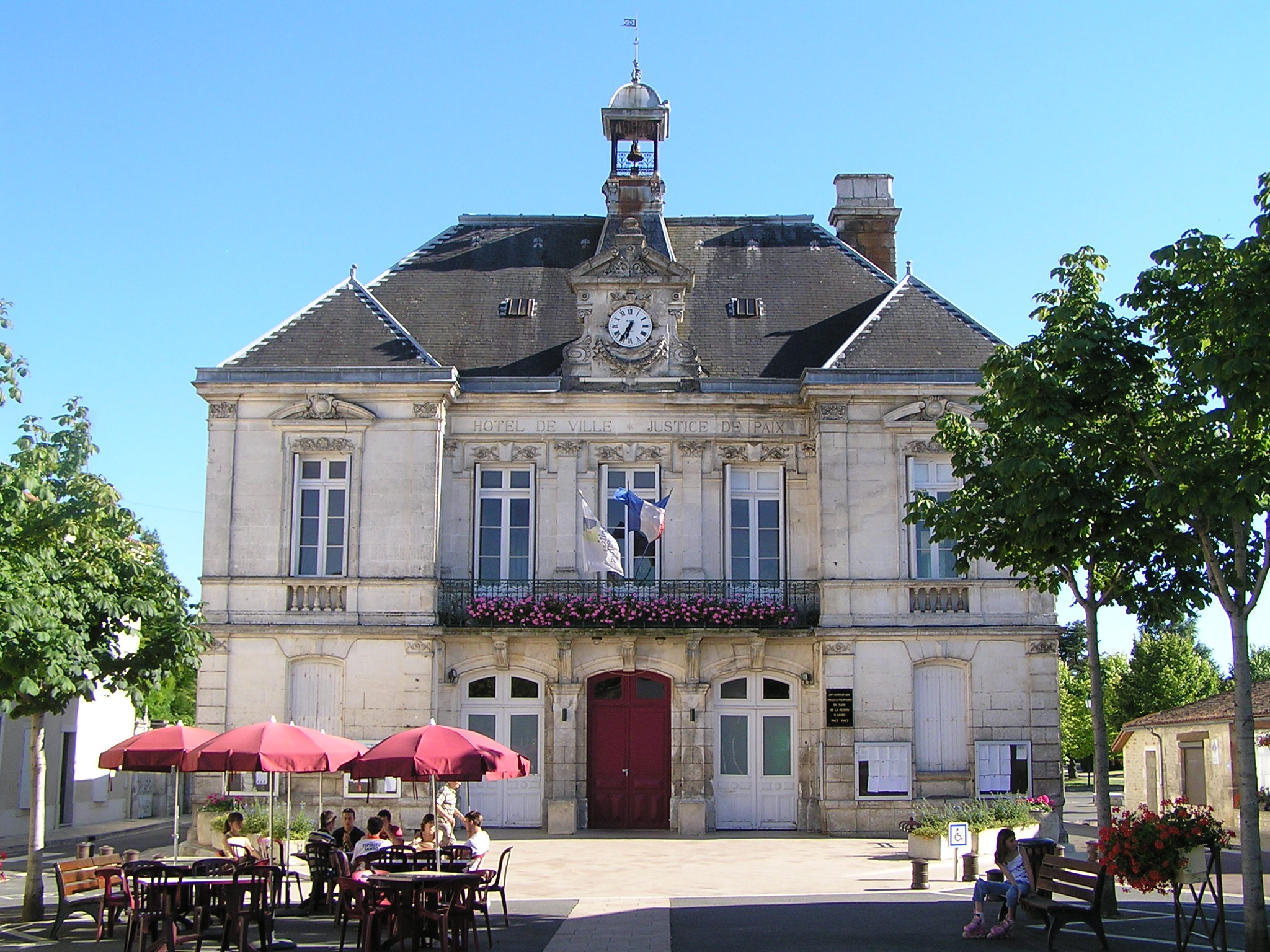
- Town hall

- Coat of arms
- Location of Aigre
- Location within France Location within Nouvelle-Aquitaine
- Coordinates: 45°53′42″N 0°00′40″E
- Country: France
- Region: Nouvelle-Aquitaine
- Department: Charente
- Arrondissement: Confolens
- Canton: Charente-Nord
- Intercommunality: Cœur de Charente

Government
  - Mayor (2020–2026): Renaud Combaud
- Area^{1}: 23.82 km^{2} (9.20 sq mi)
- Elevation: 68 m (223 ft)
- Highest elevation: 151 m (495 ft)
- Lowest elevation: 60 m (200 ft)
- Population (2023): 1,594
  - Density: 66.92/km^{2} (173.3/sq mi)
- Time zone: UTC+01:00 (CET)
  - Summer (DST): UTC+02:00 (CEST)
- INSEE/Postal code: 16005 /16140
- ^{1} French Land Register data, which excludes lakes, ponds, glaciers > 1 km^{2} (0.386 sq mi or 247 acres) and river estuaries.

Aigre (French pronunciation: [ɛɡʁ]) is a commune in the Charente department in the Nouvelle-Aquitaine region of southwestern France.

The commune has been awarded one flower by the National Council of Towns and Villages in Bloom in the Competition of cities and villages in Bloom.

== Geography ==
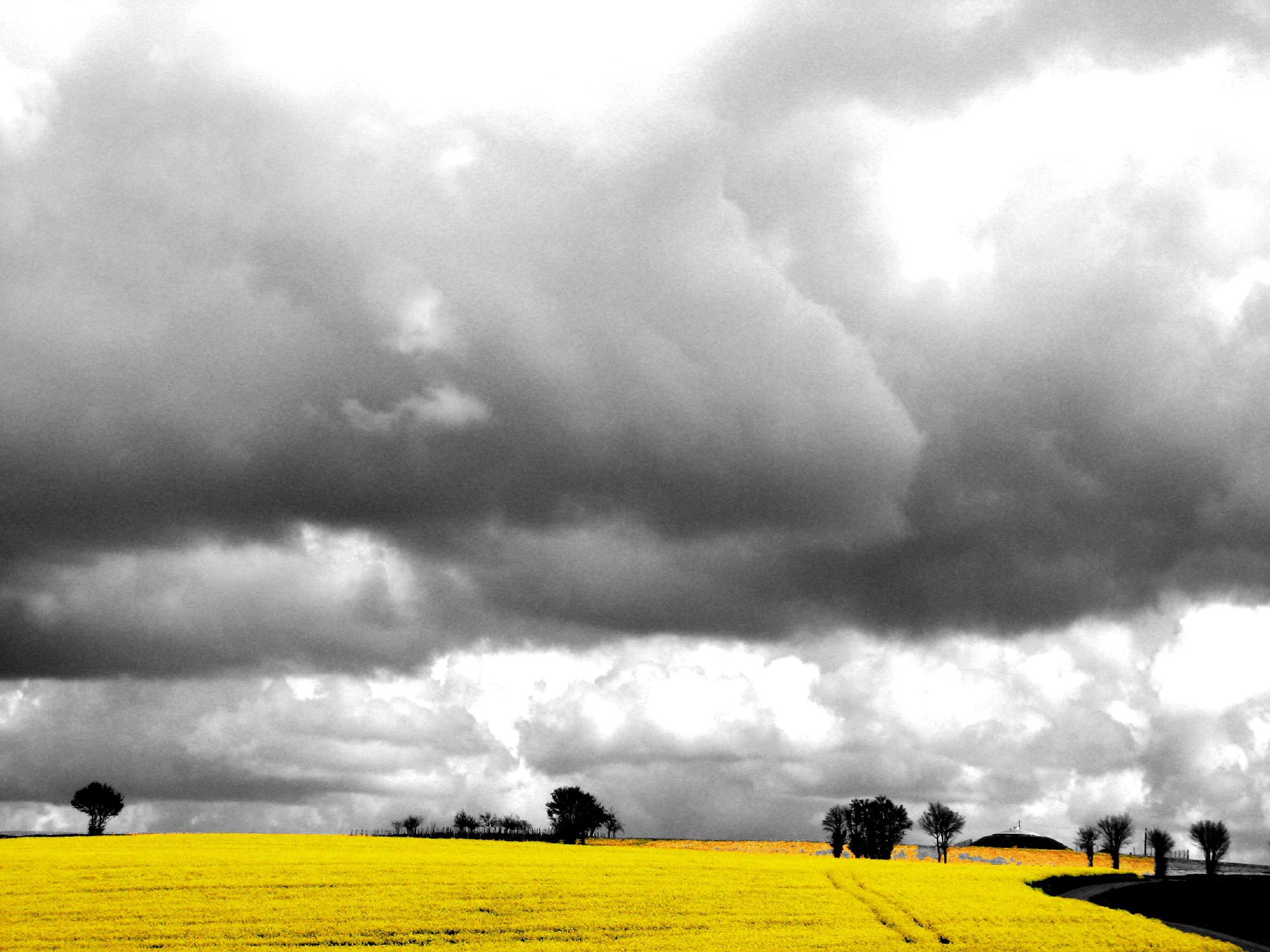
Rape fields and sky

=== Location and access ===
Aigre is located in the north-west of the Charente department 40 kilometres north of Angoulême. The town lies within the borders of the former provinces of Angoumois, Saintonge, and Poitou.

The department of Charente is not served by the French motorway network so access by the A10 autoroute is by National Route N10 at Exit 30 Poitiers-Sud in the north and by the former National Route N739 from Exit 34, Saint-Jean-d'Angely in the west.

The commune is traversed by three former national roads: the D739 which connects Tonnay-Charente to Fontafie, the D736 which connects Ruffec to Saint-Fort-sur-le-Né, and the D737 which connects Nanteuil to Angouleme.

The local railway station is Luxé station on the Paris-Bordeaux line. It is served by the TER Nouvelle-Aquitaine network and the TGV passes without stopping. The Saint-Angeau to Segonzac line once passed through Aigre.

The nearest airport is the Angoulême-Cognac Airport.

=== Hamlets and localities ===
The main hamlets are L'Ouche and Saint-Méxant to the north-west. The commune has only a few isolated farms such as La Combe and Cessac and the subdivision of La Broussette and the Castle of Crève-Cœur in the west. In the south-east there are La Servanterie, the college zone of Reuclos and Aizef at their limits with Marcillac-Lanville are essentially joined to the urban core.

=== Geology and terrain ===
The geology of the commune is limestone from the Jurassic period, part of the Aquitaine Basin as with all the northern half of Charente. The commune is on an Upper Jurassic area, specifically the Kimmeridgian. A small area of sandy soil dating from the Quaternary period covers the plateau in the south-west of the commune and alluvium (silt and clay) cover the Aume Valley on the north-eastern border. The oldest alluvium has accumulated in terraces mainly in the north of the commune.

The south of the commune is a plateau. The Aume Valley is near the north-eastern border near the town. The highest point of the commune is at an altitude of 129m located on the south-eastern boundary (IGN marker). The lowest point is 62m located on the eastern boundary along the Aume at Aizef. The town is built in an old loop of the river and is 65m above sea level.

=== Hydrography ===
Aigre is traversed by the river Aume which has its source in Bouin (Deux-Sèvres) and flows into the Charente river at Ambérac. The Aume passes through the town which is built mainly on the right bank.

The Aume divides into several branches, some of which pass through the old town.

There are also some fountains such as the Font du Geau at the foot of the Crève-Cœur Castle.

=== Climate ===
Aigre has an oceanic Aquitaine climate but like all the department underwent Cyclone Lothar and Martin in 1999, and Cyclone Klaus in 2009, and a memorable flood in December 1982.

== Toponymy ==
Aigre comes from the Latin Acriacis or villa Acriacii meaning that the village was built around the property of a rich Gallo-Roman named Acrius. At the end of the 13th century Aigre appears in the form Acriacis then Agria in the 17th century.

== History ==
There is mention of a church in the 13th century.

Nothing is left of a Castle located at a place called Saint-Mexant which was the subject of fortification works in 1472 except the dovecote, the enclosure, and the moat in 1906. The chapel built before 1706 has also been destroyed.

Aigre belonged to the Lordship of Marcillac and was a very poor vicarage of the archpriest of Ambérac. It was vacant and annexed to Mons from the 15th century. In 1789, a priest for Aigre was finally provided. Marie de' Medici stopped over in Aigre in 1619.

In the 16th century a large part of the population became part of the reformation and together with Marcillac formed a Protestant parish of the Synod of Poitou. Protestantism was prohibited in Marcillac in 1665 then on 31 March 1667 a decision of the grand Seneschal of Poitou ordered the closure of the Protestant place of worship in Aigre.

On 1 January 2019, the former commune of Villejésus was merged into Aigre.

=== Heraldry ===
Arms of Aigre	Blazon: Or, a bend sinister of azure charged with a bunch of grapes surmounted by an ear of corn at sinister 2 ears of wheat in bouquet, the whole of Or debruised at dexter by a snail the same shelled azure, the whole accompanied at sinister by 13 Gouttes set in an arc: 4 in chief azure, 3 on bend of Or, and 6 at sinister azure.

== Administration ==
List of Successive Mayors of Aigre

From	To	Name	Party	Position
2001	2008	Philippe Combaud	ind.	Insurer
2008	2020	Jean-Paul Ayrault	DVD	Agricultural technician
2020	2026	Renaud Combaud		

=== Taxation ===
Taxation is a rate of 16.05% on buildings, 49.81% on undeveloped land, 7.13% for residence tax, and business tax of 11.48% (2007 rates).

The Community of communes levies 2.61% on buildings, 6.06% on undeveloped land, 1.09% for residence tax, and business tax of 1.45%.

=== Twinning ===
Aigre has twinning associations with:

- Fahrenkrug (Germany) since 1987.

== Population ==
The inhabitants of the commune are known as Aigrinois or Aigrinoises in French.

Historical population
Year	Pop.	±% p.a.
1968	1,681	—
1975	1,676	−0.04%
1982	1,657	−0.16%
1990	1,726	+0.51%
1999	1,685	−0.27%
2007	1,662	−0.17%
2012	1,639	−0.28%
2017	1,591	−0.59%
2023	1,594	+0.03%
Source: INSEE

== Economy ==
The Wheat mill, called the Moulin du Château dates from the 18th century and was converted in the 19th century to using the driving force of the water for the workshop for making Angelus liqueur.

Currently, it has become the Gautier distillery which in 1990 employed 32 people at the plant and 20 in sales.

Cognac Gautier joined the Berger group in 1975 which was itself taken over by the Marie Brizard group in 1995.

== Facilities, services, and local life ==
=== Education ===
The secondary college of Osme hosts 180-200 students from the 6th to the 3rd divided into eight classes.

Aigre also has a primary school with four classes.

=== Services ===
As the capital of the Canton, Aigre has a police station and a rescue centre.

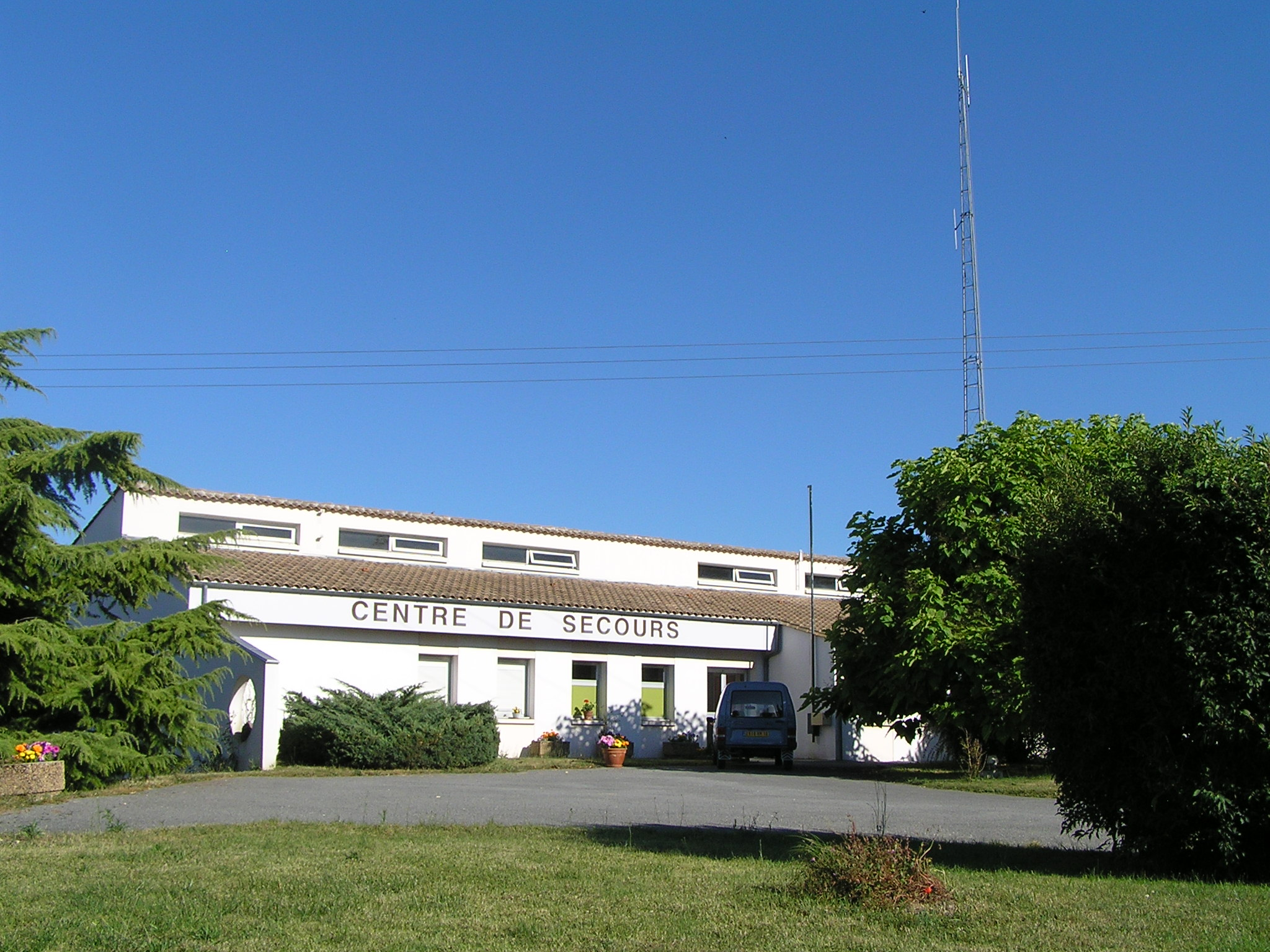
The Rescue Centre

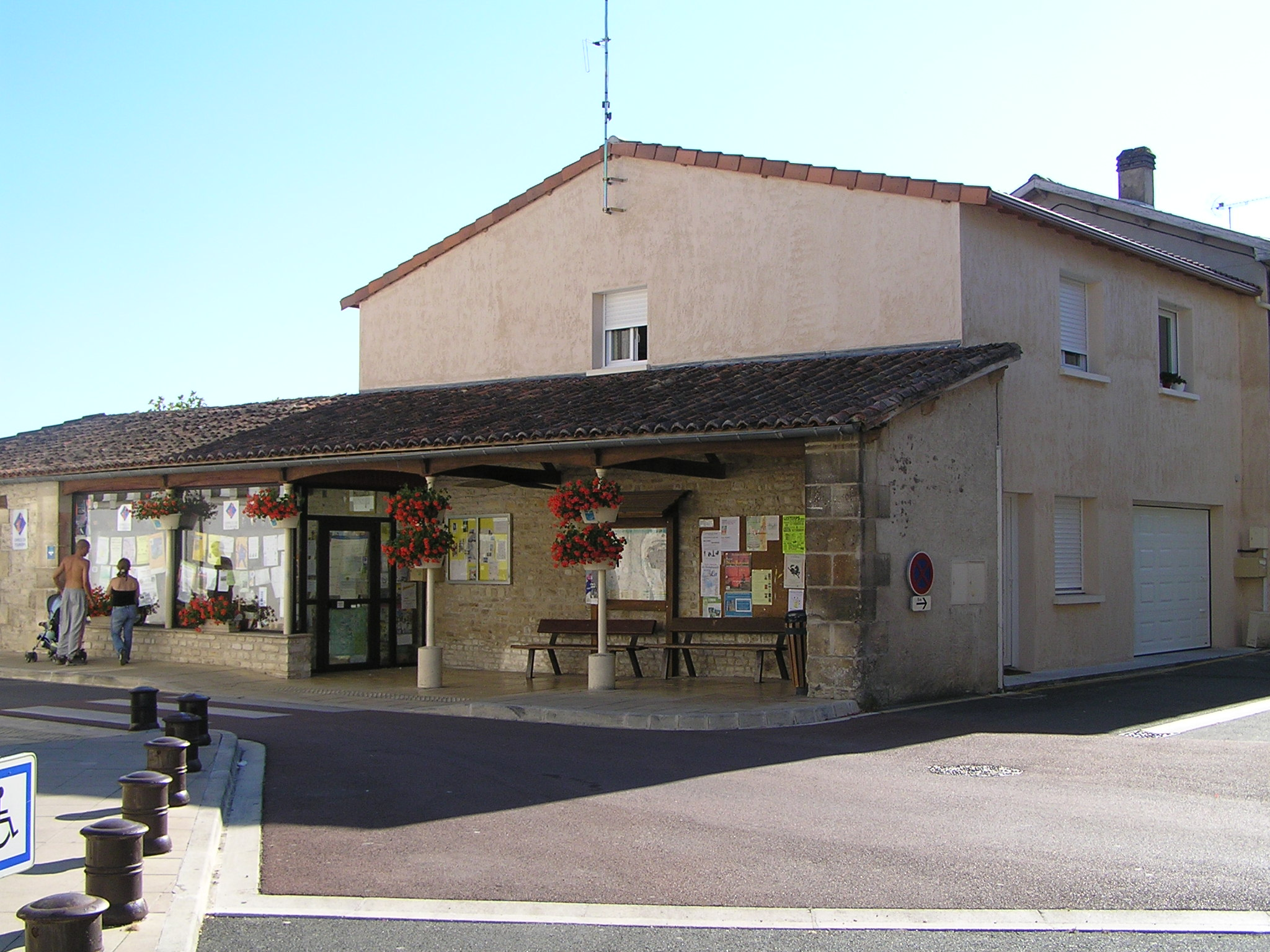
The Tourist Information Centre

=== Sports ===
==== Cycling ====
The cycling track is located in the town. The club is called ACJAR and they organize several amateur races in the north-west of Charente such as the Criterium of Villejésus and the Tour of Aigre country. In 2010, the club organized, with the French federation of wheelchair sports, the championship of France of for wheelchair cycling in the commune of Saint-Fraigne.

The town had already been traversed by the Tour de France but in 2009 for the first time it held the 1st stage in the 23rd Tour du Poitou-Charentes and the victory of Anthony Ravard on 25 August 2009. The start of the second stage took place the next day at Rouillac.

Bicycle touring has increased since the CC Aigrinois organized a biennial event called the Coco Trainaud whose last event was held on 15 May 2011. It is named after a former rider who has done a lot for local cycling.

==== Football ====
Soccer is a major sport in the commune with a club founded in 1902 that participated in the USFSA championship of Charentes before the First World War. Thereafter the club has long been at the regional level and was in 1968 the winner of the Challenge of the Central-West League.

== Sites and Monuments ==
=== Civil heritage ===
The commune has several sites that are registered as historical monuments:

- A House at l'Ouche (1793)
- A House at Rue de l'Eglise (19th century)
- A House at 17 Rue de l'Eglise (15th century)
- A House at Rue des Planches (19th century)
- A Flour Mill at 28 Rue des Ponts (18th century)
- A House at 2 Rue de la Servanterie (1774)
- A House at RN 736 (19th century)
- A Chateau at Saint Mexant (destroyed) (15th century)
- Houses and Farms (15th, 18th-19th centuries)
- A Chateau at Crève-Coeur (19th century)

There are many registered historical objects in the commune, several of which are in private collections.

=== Religious Heritage ===
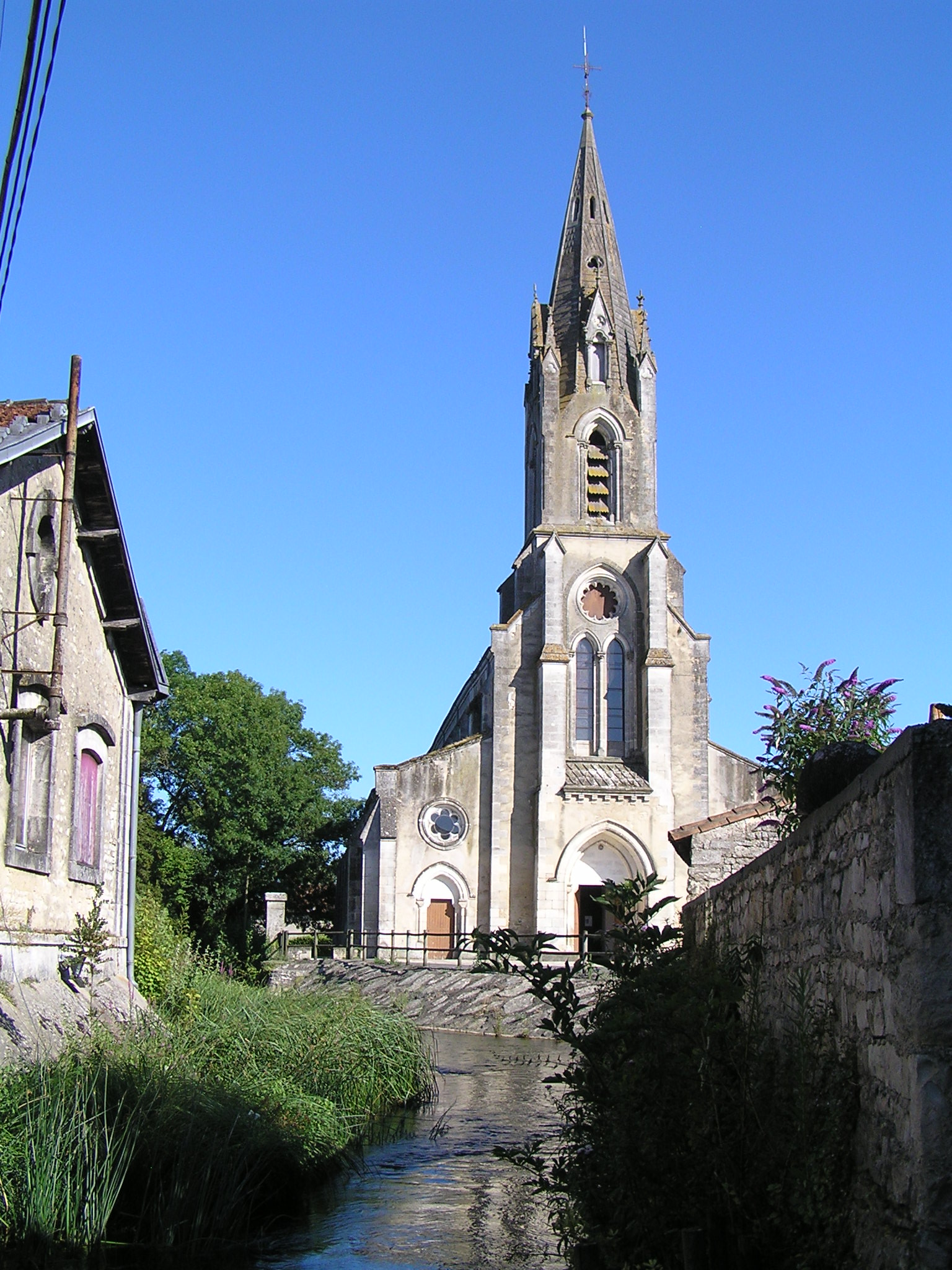
The Church

The commune has two religious sites that are registered as historical monuments:

- A Chapel at Saint Mexant (17th century)
- The Parish Church of Saint Pierre (1875). The church was first built in 1620 then rebuilt in 1868 but collapsed in 1870 and was rebuilt again from 1874 to 1877. The bell tower spire was completed in masonry in 1882. The church contains a number of items that are registered as historical objects:
  - A Bronze Bell called Marie Louise (1807)
  - An Altar and Tabernacle (19th century)
  - An Altar and Tabernacle (19th century)
  - An Altar and Tabernacle (19th century)
  - 2 Stained glass windows: Saint Louis and Saint Radegonde (1876)
  - 3 Stained glass windows of people (1876)
  - A Portal (19th century)

=== Environmental heritage ===
Aigre is located on the Aume river.

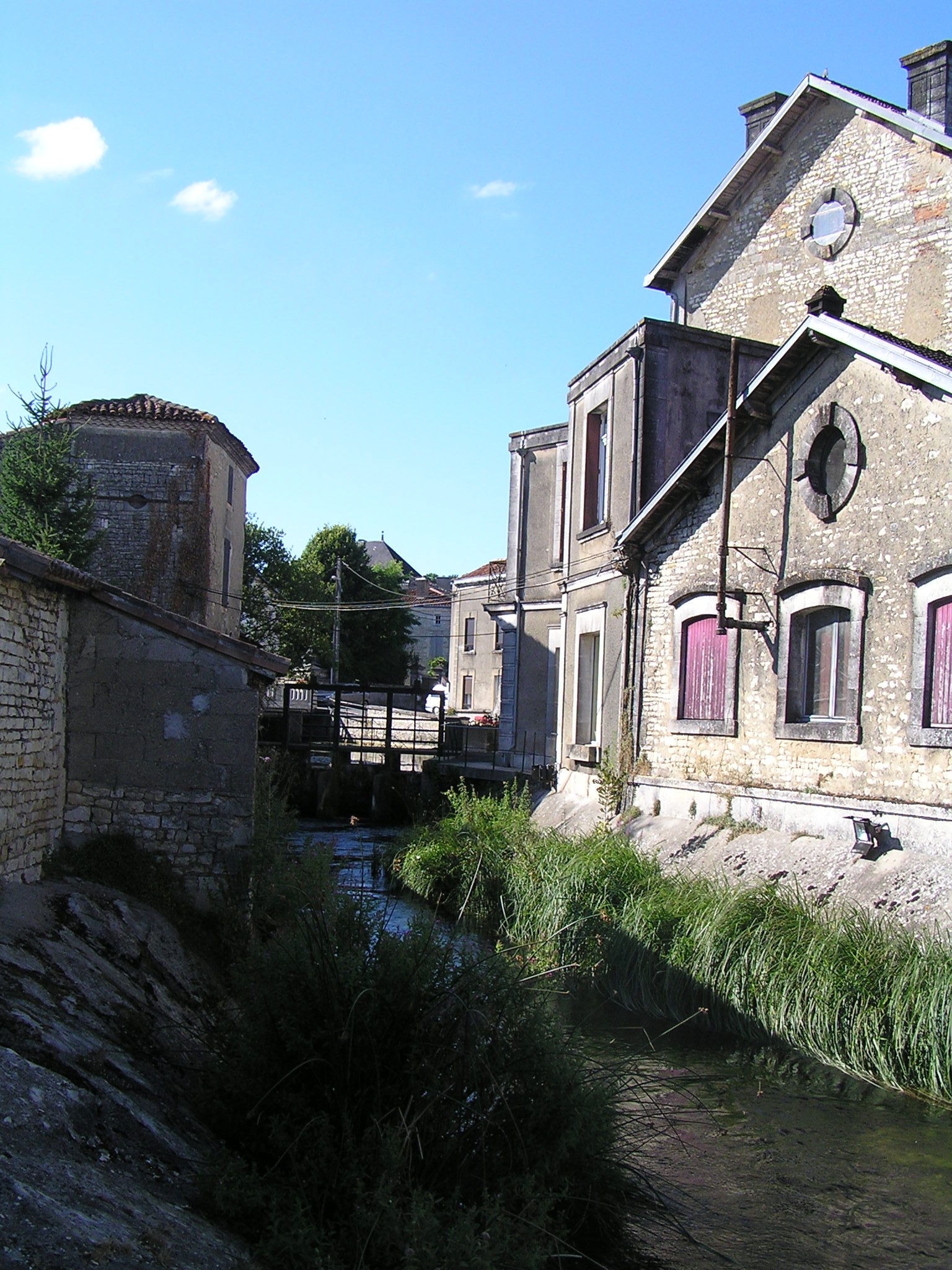
The canal

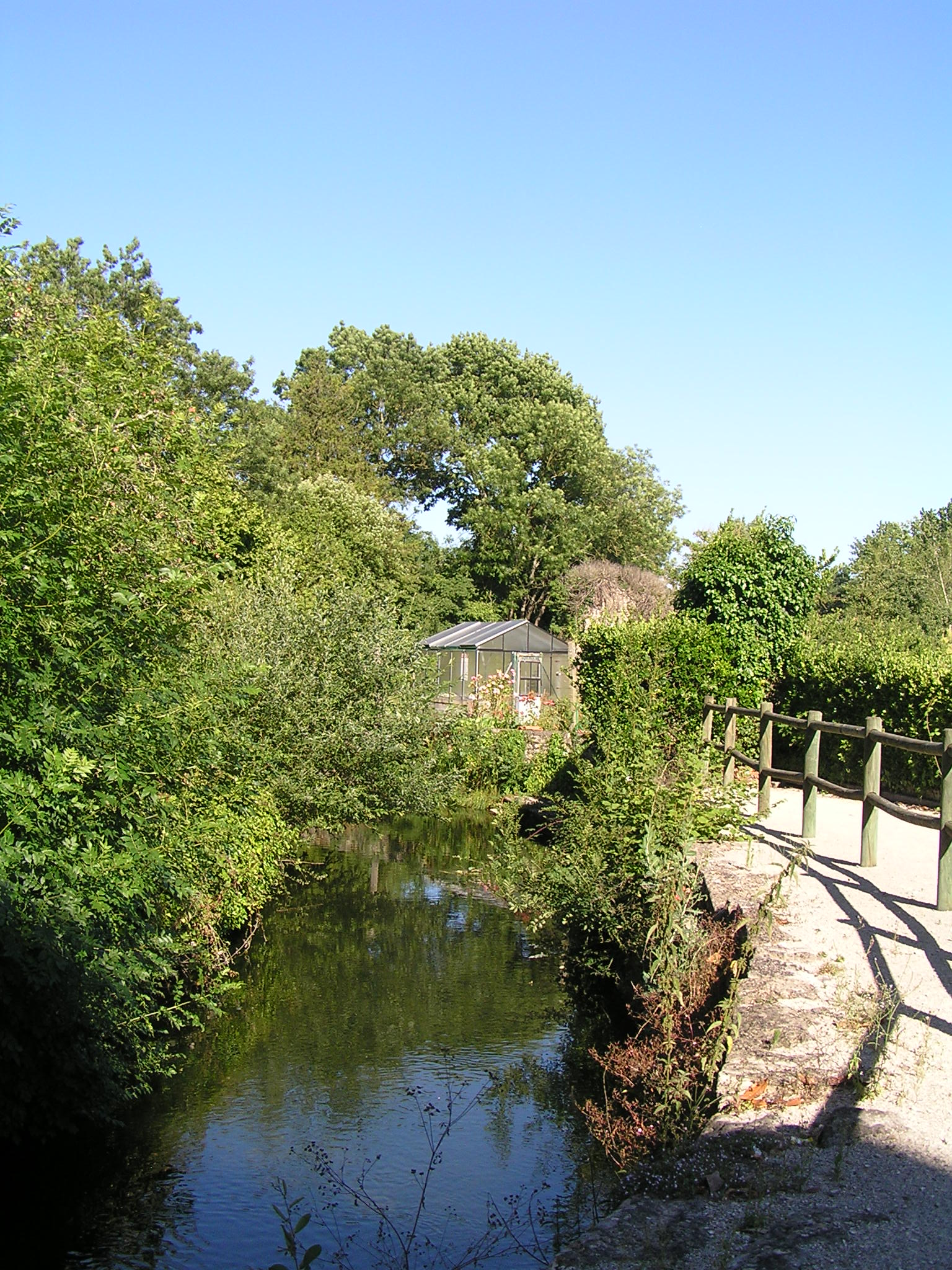
The Gardens

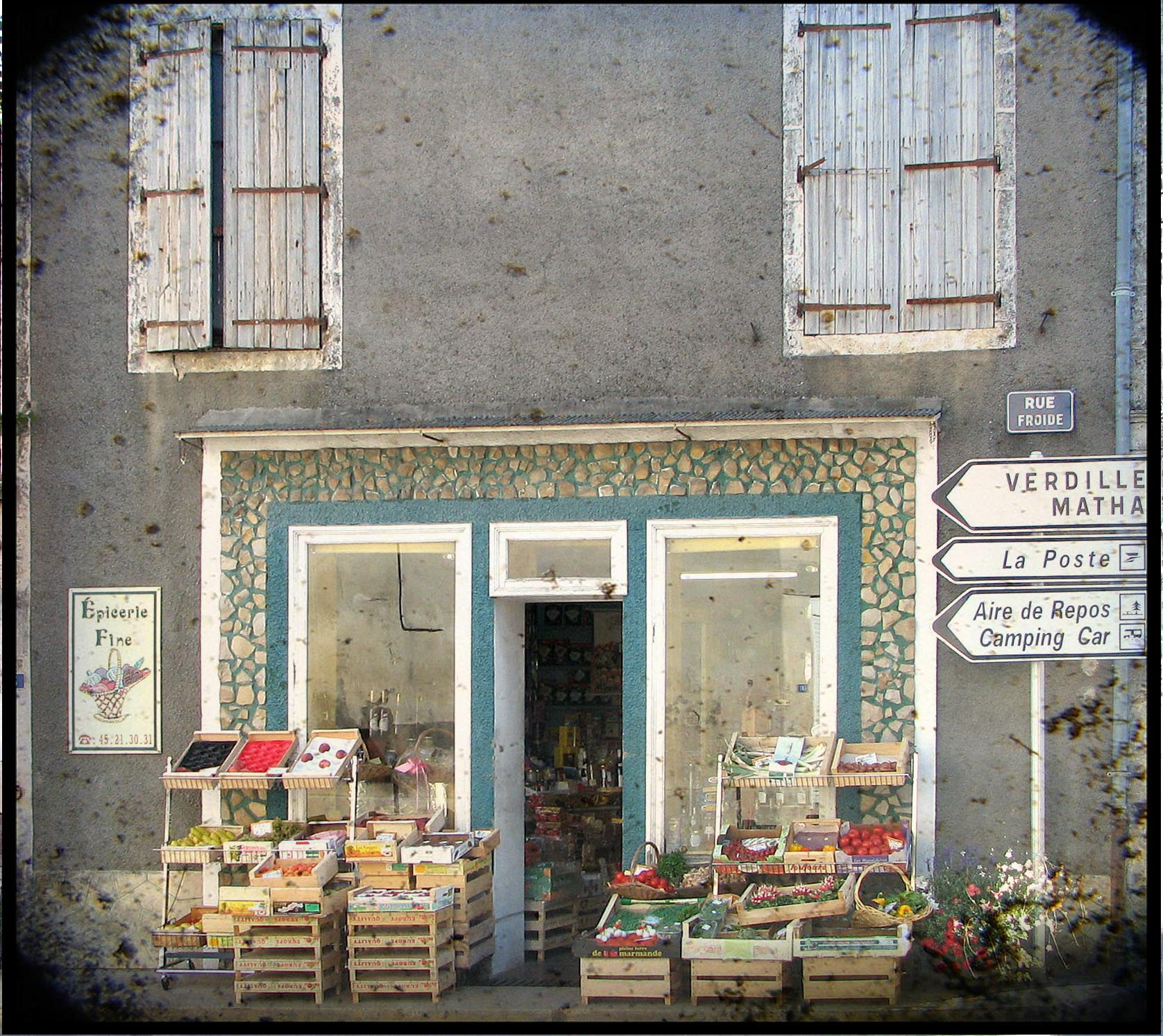
The Delicatessen

== Notable People linked to the commune ==
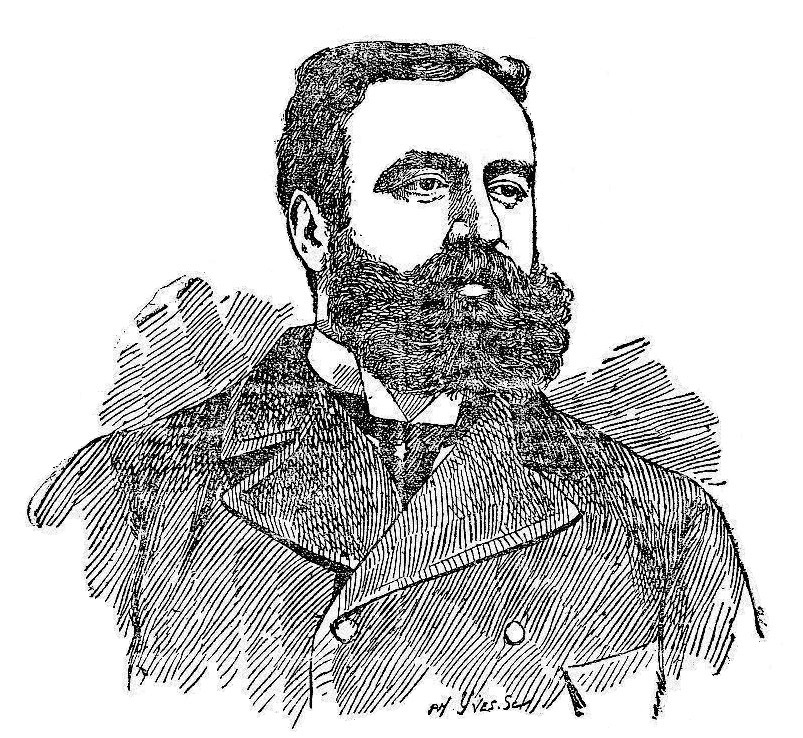
René Gautier

- Bertrand Hériard Dubreuil, graduate of the Ecole Centrale de Lille, head of Ceras
- Louis Gustave Chauveaud (1859–1933), botanist and anatomist, born in Aigre
- Paul Flamand, founder of Editions du Seuil, born in Aigre
- Louis Gautier (1810–1884), Bonapartist politician, born in Aigre
- René François Gautier (1851–1936), politician, born in Aigre

== See also ==
- Communes of the Charente department
