= Mansle-les-Fontaines =

- Commune
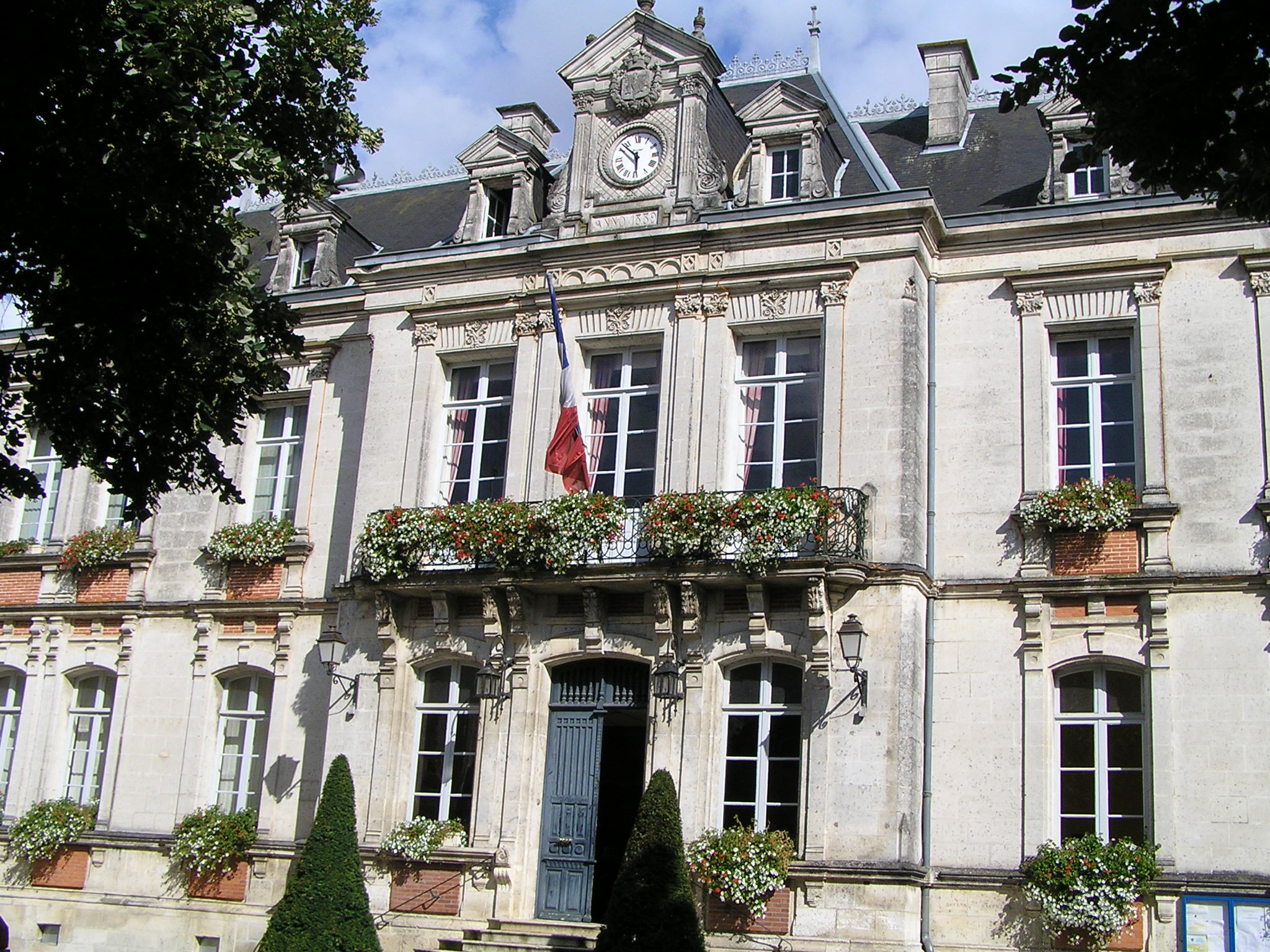
- Mansle-les-Fontaines Town hall
- Location of Mansle-les-Fontaines
- Location within France Location within Nouvelle-Aquitaine
- Coordinates: 45°52′35″N 0°10′48″E
- Country: France
- Region: Nouvelle-Aquitaine
- Department: Charente
- Arrondissement: Confolens
- Canton: Boixe-et-Manslois
- Intercommunality: CC Cœur de Charente

Government
  - Mayor (2023–2026): Christian Croizard
- Area^{1}: 11.36 km^{2} (4.39 sq mi)
- Highest elevation: 124 m (407 ft)
- Lowest elevation: 55 m (180 ft)
- Population (2023): 2,088
  - Density: 183.8/km^{2} (476.0/sq mi)
- Time zone: UTC+01:00 (CET)
  - Summer (DST): UTC+02:00 (CEST)
- INSEE/Postal code: 16206 /16230
- ^{1} French Land Register data, which excludes lakes, ponds, glaciers > 1 km^{2} (0.386 sq mi or 247 acres) and river estuaries.

Mansle-les-Fontaines is a commune in the department of Charente in the Nouvelle-Aquitaine region of western France. It was established as a commune nouvelle on 1 January 2023 from the merger of the communes of Mansle and Fontclaireau.

== Population ==
Population data refer to the commune in its geography as of January 2025.

Historical population
Year	Pop.	±% p.a.
1968	1,767	—
1975	1,919	+1.19%
1982	1,778	−1.08%
1990	1,901	+0.84%
1999	1,957	+0.32%
2007	1,889	−0.44%
2012	2,051	+1.66%
2017	2,107	+0.54%
2023	2,088	−0.15%
Source: INSEE

== See also ==
- Communes of the Charente department
