= Fontclaireau =

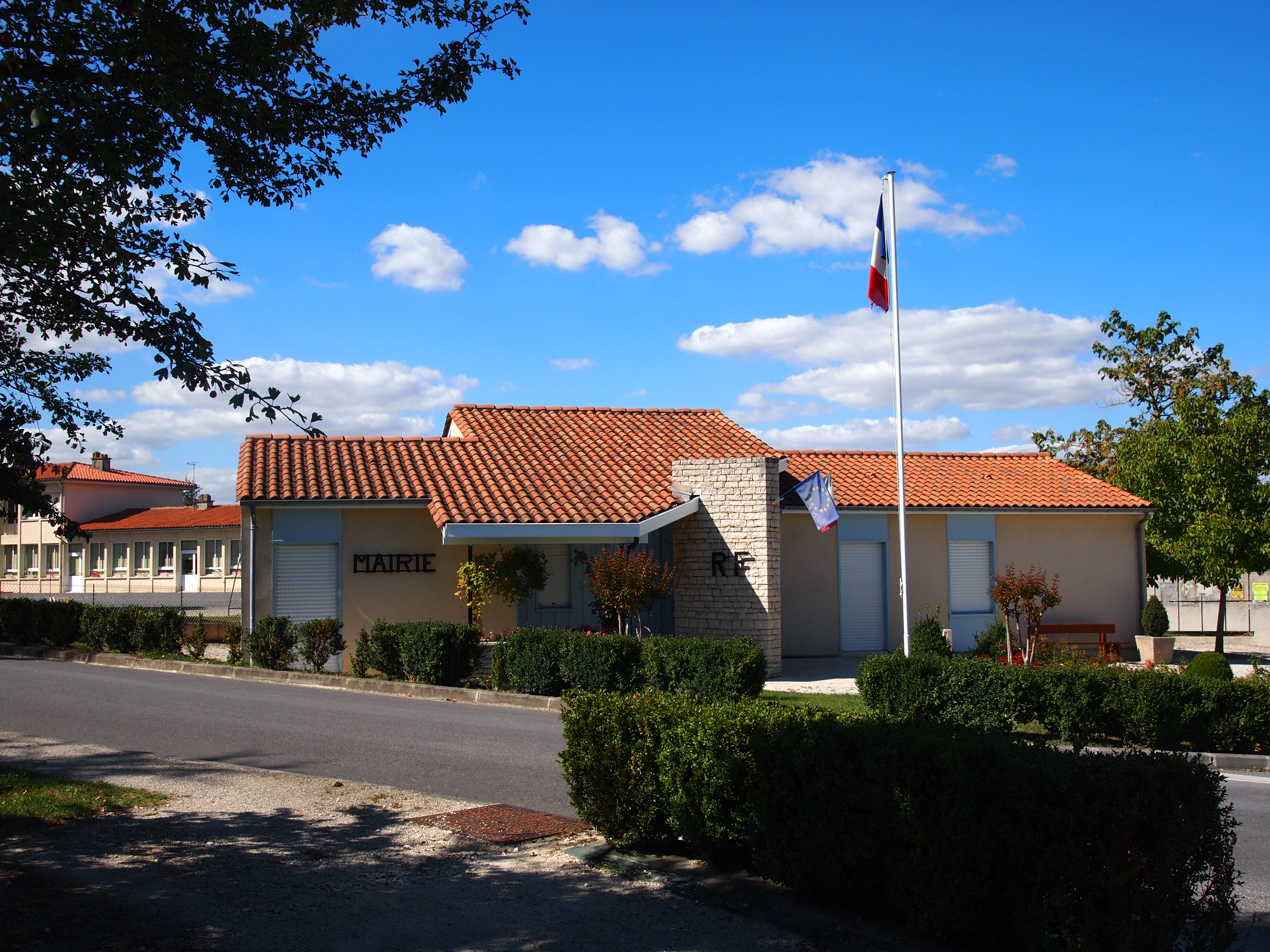
- Town hall
- Location of Fontclaireau
- Location within France Location within Nouvelle-Aquitaine
- Coordinates: 45°53′44″N 0°12′12″E
- Country: France
- Region: Nouvelle-Aquitaine
- Department: Charente
- Arrondissement: Confolens
- Canton: Boixe-et-Manslois
- Area^{1}: 5.61 km^{2} (2.17 sq mi)
- Elevation: 124 m (407 ft)
- Highest elevation: 124 m (407 ft)
- Lowest elevation: 56 m (184 ft)
- Population (2023): 431
  - Density: 76.8/km^{2} (199/sq mi)
- Time zone: UTC+01:00 (CET)
  - Summer (DST): UTC+02:00 (CEST)
- INSEE/Postal code: 16140 /16230
- ^{1} French Land Register data, which excludes lakes, ponds, glaciers > 1 km^{2} (0.386 sq mi or 247 acres) and river estuaries.

Fontclaireau (French pronunciation: [fɔ̃klɛʁo]) is a former commune in the Charente department in southwestern France. On 1 January 2023, it was merged into the new commune of Mansle-les-Fontaines.

== See also ==
- Communes of the Charente department
