= René François Gautier =

French politician

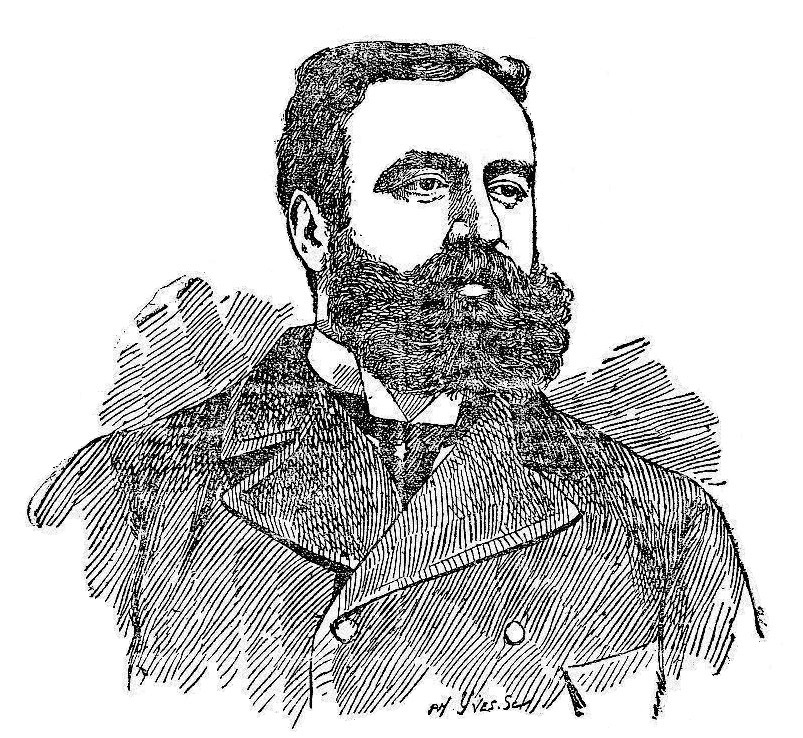
- Gathier from La Presse, 26 April 1890

Deputy of Charente
- In office 29 February 1880 – 14 October 1885

Deputy of Charente
- In office 3 September 1893 – 31 May 1898

Personal details
- Born: 25 April 1851 Aigre, Charente, France
- Died: 30 August 1936 (aged 85) Paris, France
- Occupation: Politician

René François Gautier (25 April 1851 – 30 August 1936) was a French Bonapartiste politician. He was twice deputy of Charente during the French Third Republic.

== Life ==
René-François Gautier was born on 25 April 1851 in Aigre, Charente. His father was Louis Gautier, deputy of Charente.

After his father resigned, René-François Gautier was elected in his place for the district of Ruffec on 29 February 1880. He won by 7,277 votes to 6,876 for his republican opponent. In the Chamber he joined the Appel au peuple parliamentary group, and voted with the conservative minority. He voted against the amnesty for the members of the Paris Commune, against the new laws on the press and the right of assembly. He was reelected on 21 August 1881. He spoke out against the ministries of Léon Gambetta and Jules Ferry, and against the colonial policy. He did not run for reelection on 4 October 1885. He left office on 14 October 1885.

Gautier was elected to the General Council of Charente for the canton of Aigre. He ran in the by-election in Ruffec on 27 April 1890 after the death of John de Champvallier^{(fr)}, but was defeated in the second round by the republican candidate Eugène Duportal^{(fr)}. He ran again in the general elections of 1893 against Duportal and was elected on 3 September 1893. During the session that followed he did not participate in debates but submitted a draft proposal to revise the constitutional laws to allow direct election by universal suffrage of the President and the two Chambers and to let the people to decide by vote on the constitutional laws. He held office until 31 May 1898.

Gautier did not run for reelection until 1910, when he was defeated in the second round by the incumbent Maurice Raynaud^{(fr)}. He died on 30 August 1936 in Paris.

== Sources ==
- Jolly, Jean (1960–1977), "GAUTIER, RENÉ, FRANÇOIS", Dictionnaire des parlementaires français de 1889 à 1940 (in French), Paris: Éditeur : Presses universitaires de France, ISBN 2-1100-1998-0
- René-François Gautier (in French), Assemblée nationale
- Robert, Adolphe; Cougny, Gaston (1889–1891), "GAUTIER (RENÉ FRANÇOIS)", in Edgar Bourloton (ed.), Dictionnaire des Parlementaires français (1789–1889) (in French)
