= Villejésus =

- Part of Aigre
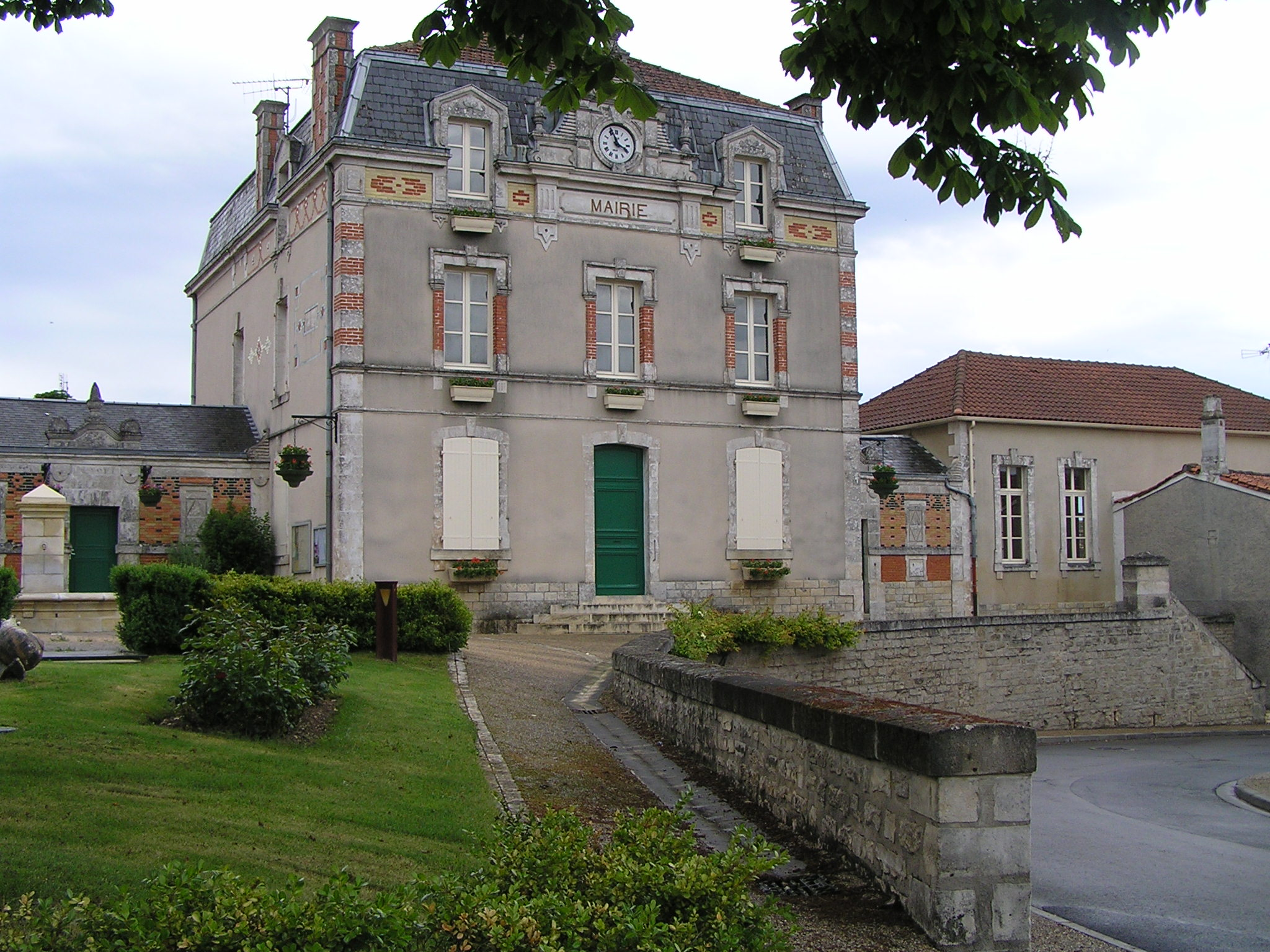
- Town hall
- Location of Villejésus
- Location within France Location within Nouvelle-Aquitaine
- Coordinates: 45°53′46″N 0°01′49″E
- Country: France
- Region: Nouvelle-Aquitaine
- Department: Charente
- Arrondissement: Confolens
- Canton: Charente-Nord
- Commune: Aigre
- Area^{1}: 17.23 km^{2} (6.65 sq mi)
- Highest elevation: 151 m (495 ft)
- Lowest elevation: 60 m (200 ft)
- Population (2022): 526
  - Density: 30.5/km^{2} (79.1/sq mi)
- Time zone: UTC+01:00 (CET)
  - Summer (DST): UTC+02:00 (CEST)
- Postal code: 16140
- ^{1} French Land Register data, which excludes lakes, ponds, glaciers > 1 km^{2} (0.386 sq mi or 247 acres) and river estuaries.

Villejésus (French pronunciation: [vilʒəzy]) is a former commune in the Charente department in southwestern France. On 1 January 2019, it was merged into the commune Aigre.

== Population ==
Historical population

Year	Pop.	±% p.a.
1793	1,012	—
1800	1,101	+1.21%
1806	1,156	+0.82%
1821	1,268	+0.62%
1831	1,289	+0.16%
1841	1,292	+0.02%
1846	1,256	−0.56%
1851	1,243	−0.21%
1856	1,160	−1.37%
1861	1,183	+0.39%
1866	1,113	−1.21%
1872	1,134	+0.31%
1876	1,089	−1.01%
1881	975	−2.19%
1886	848	−2.75%
1891	865	+0.40%
1896	770	−2.30%

Year	Pop.	±% p.a.
1901	769	−0.03%
1906	764	−0.13%
1911	783	+0.49%
1921	697	−1.16%
1926	722	+0.71%
1931	625	−2.84%
1936	592	−1.08%
1946	548	−0.77%
1954	585	+0.82%
1962	542	−0.95%
1968	531	−0.34%
1975	511	−0.55%
1982	491	−0.57%
1990	550	+1.43%
1999	544	−0.12%
2022	526	−0.15%

Source: EHESS and INSEE (2022)

== See also ==
- Communes of the Charente department
