= Marie Brizard et Roger International =

French alcoholic drinks company

- Type: Subsidiary of Belvédère
- Industry: Alcohol
- Founded: 1755
- Headquarters: Ivry-sur-Seine, France
- Key people: Erick Antony Skora, Managing Director
- Products: Alcoholic beverages
- Website: www.mariebrizard.com

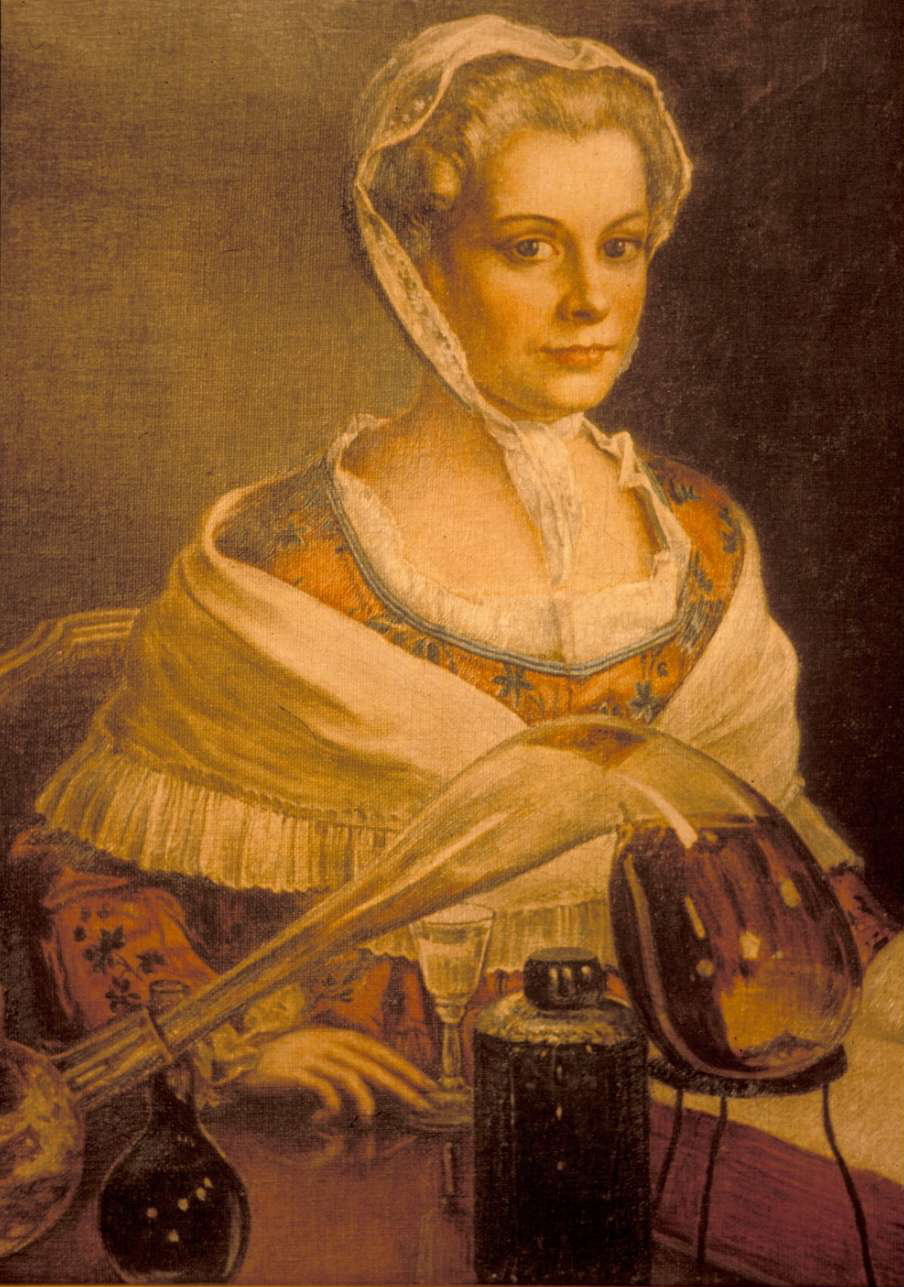
Portrait of Marie Brizard

Marie Brizard et Roger International is a French alcoholic beverage company founded in 1755. It has been a subsidiary of Belvédère since 2006, and is based in Ivry-sur-Seine, France.

The company sells liquors, pure cane syrups, recipes, and cocktails and mixes. The products are available in over 120 countries.

The founder, Marie Brizard, was born in 1714 in Bordeaux one of 15 children of a barrel carpenter. In 1755, she took care of an ill West Indian sailor, and in return he gave her a recipe for aniseed liquor. That year, she and her nephew, Jean-Baptiste Roger, founded the company. The company began to grow, and was even presented to King Louis XV. In 1795, Jean-Baptiste Roger died. In 1801, Marie died. The company was passed to the widow of Roger, and the family kept ownership of the company for over ten generations until 1998. In 1954, it became a public limited company.

== Gallery ==
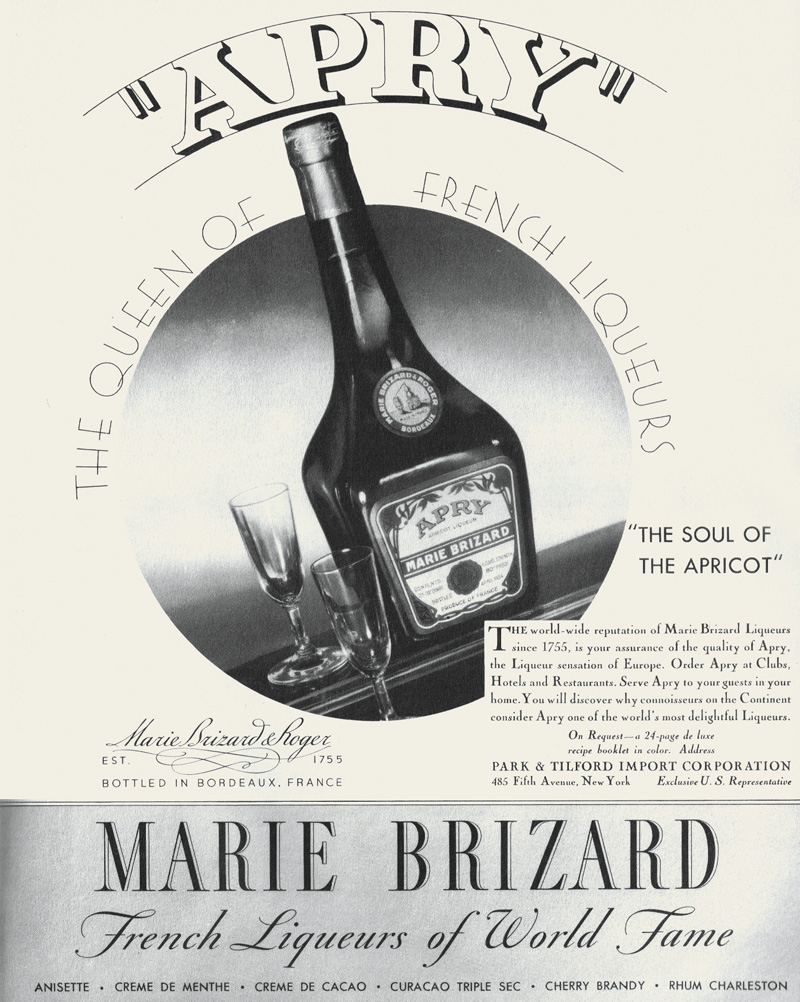
1934 ad for Apry Marie Brizard Roger French Apricot Liqueur

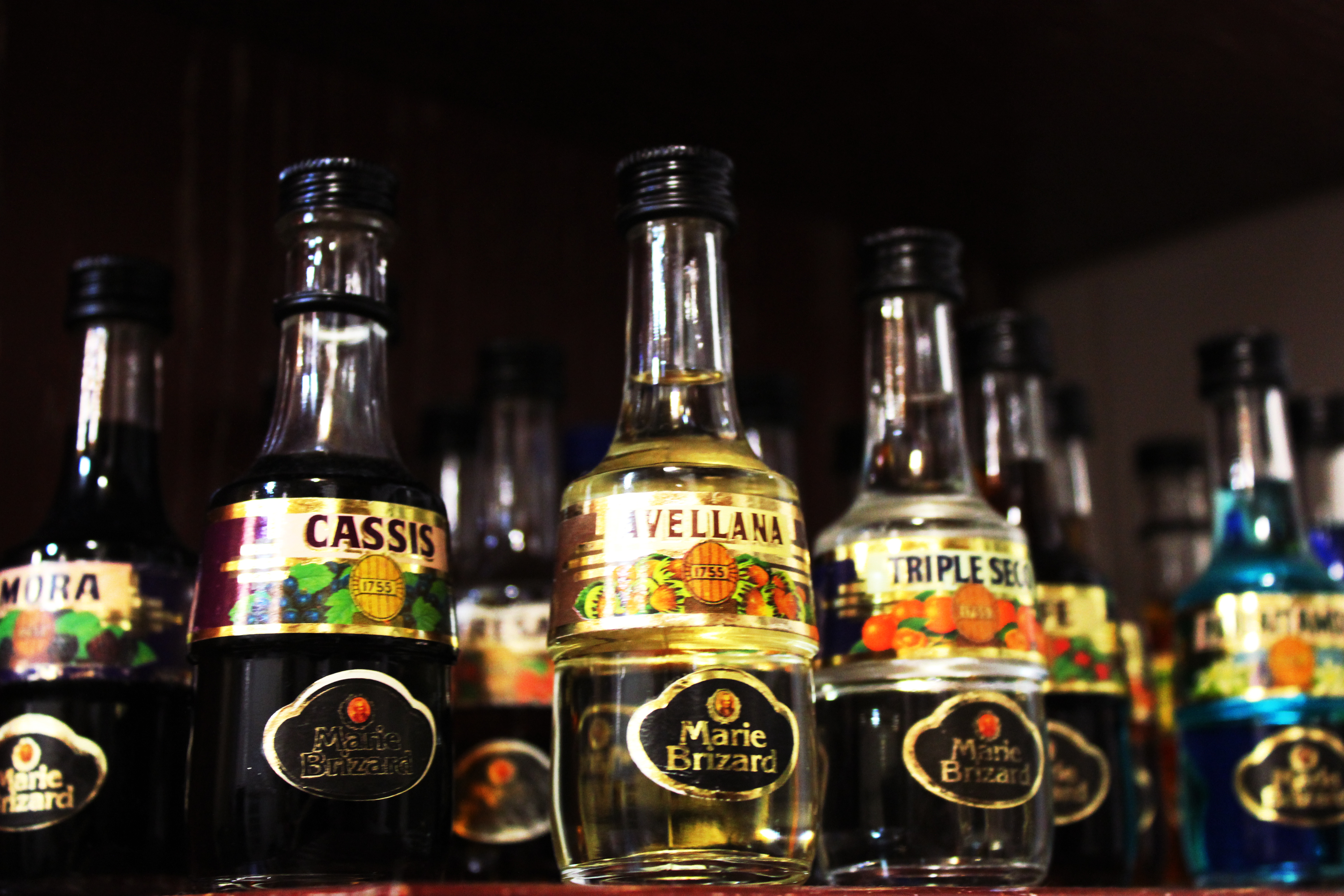
Display of several products

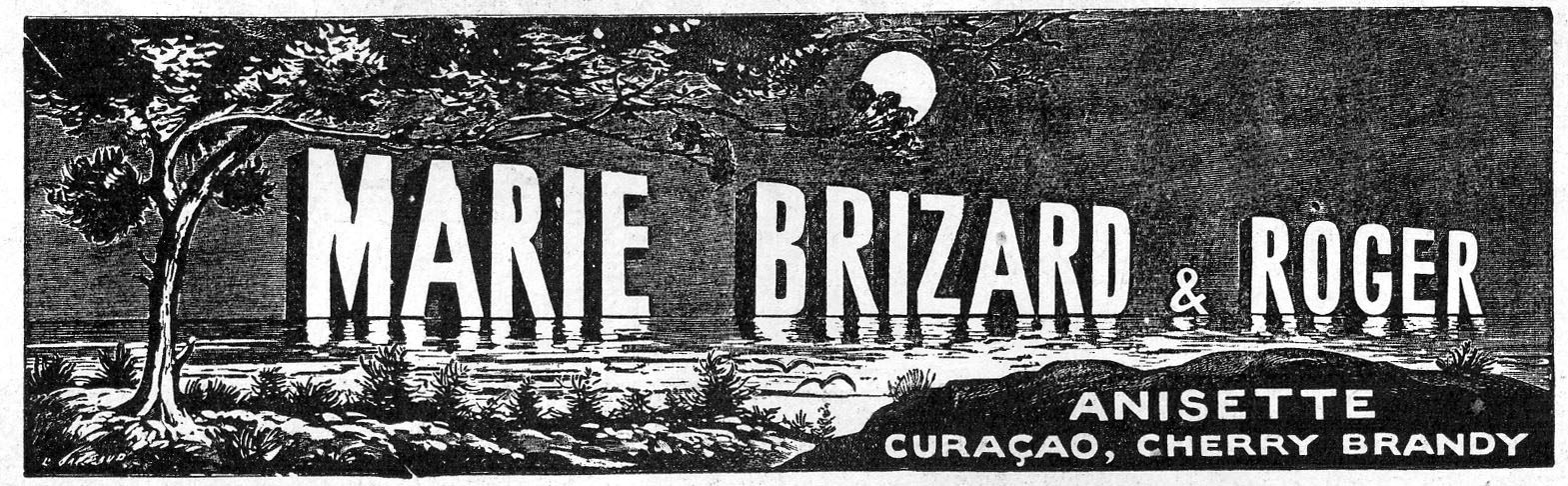
Marie Brizard advertisement from 1923

== See also ==
- Marie Brizard Wine & Spirits
