= Fouqueure =

- Commune
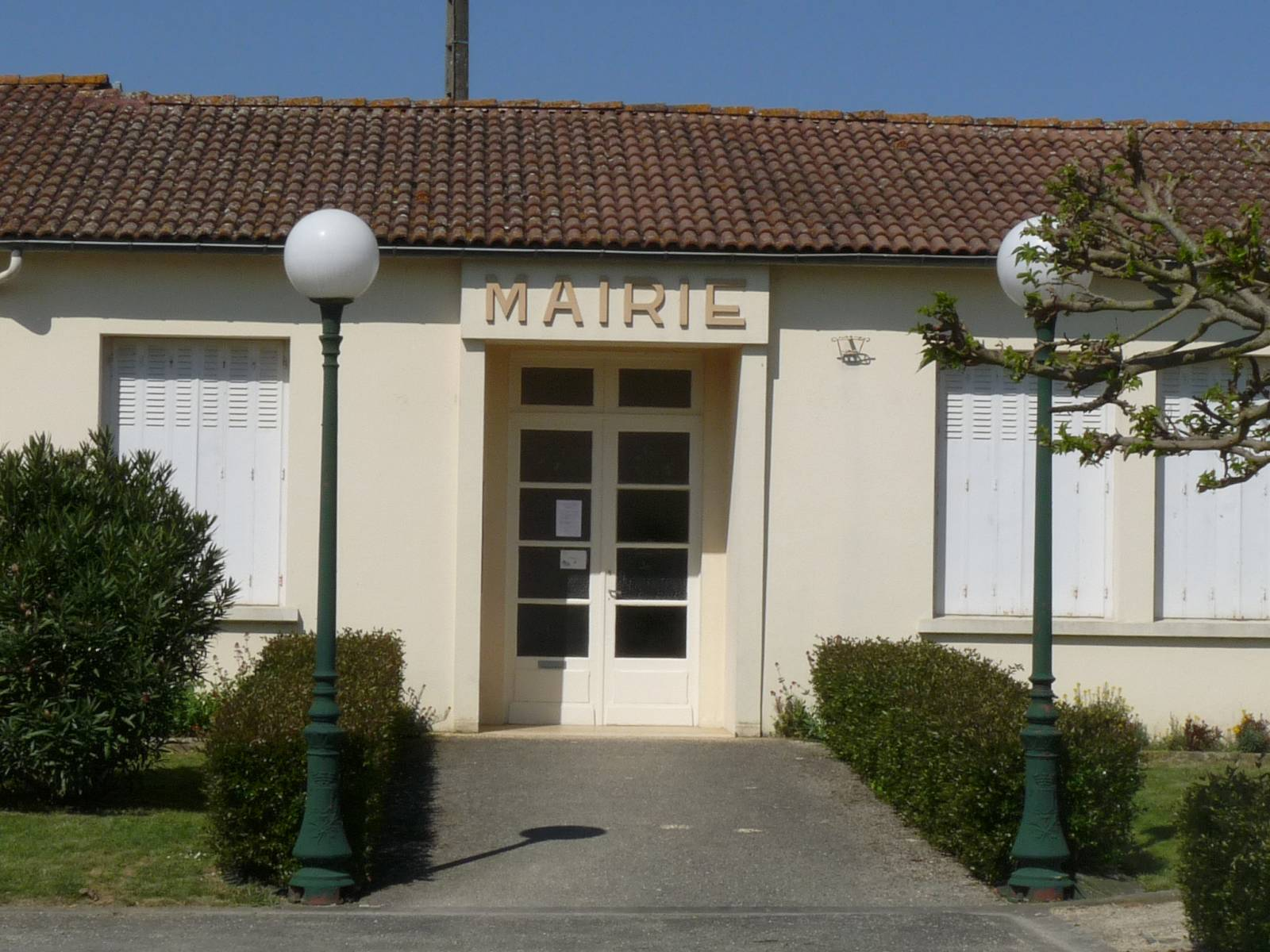
- The town hall in Fouqueure
- Location of Fouqueure
- Location within France Location within Nouvelle-Aquitaine
- Coordinates: 45°53′05″N 0°04′26″E
- Country: France
- Region: Nouvelle-Aquitaine
- Department: Charente
- Arrondissement: Confolens
- Canton: Charente-Nord

Government
  - Mayor (2020–2026): Yves Flaud
- Area^{1}: 16.43 km^{2} (6.34 sq mi)
- Elevation: 70 m (230 ft)
- Highest elevation: 123 m (404 ft)
- Lowest elevation: 50 m (160 ft)
- Population (2023): 429
  - Density: 26.1/km^{2} (67.6/sq mi)
- Time zone: UTC+01:00 (CET)
  - Summer (DST): UTC+02:00 (CEST)
- INSEE/Postal code: 16144 /16140
- ^{1} French Land Register data, which excludes lakes, ponds, glaciers > 1 km^{2} (0.386 sq mi or 247 acres) and river estuaries.

Fouqueure (French pronunciation: [fukœʁ]) is a commune in the Charente department in southwestern France.

== Population ==
Historical population
Year	Pop.	±% p.a.
1968	490	—
1975	471	−0.56%
1982	437	−1.06%
1990	426	−0.32%
1999	428	+0.05%
2007	427	−0.03%
2012	403	−1.15%
2017	402	−0.05%
2023	429	+1.09%
Source: INSEE

== See also ==
- Communes of the Charente department
