= Mansle =

Commune in Charente, France

- Part of Mansle-les-Fontaines
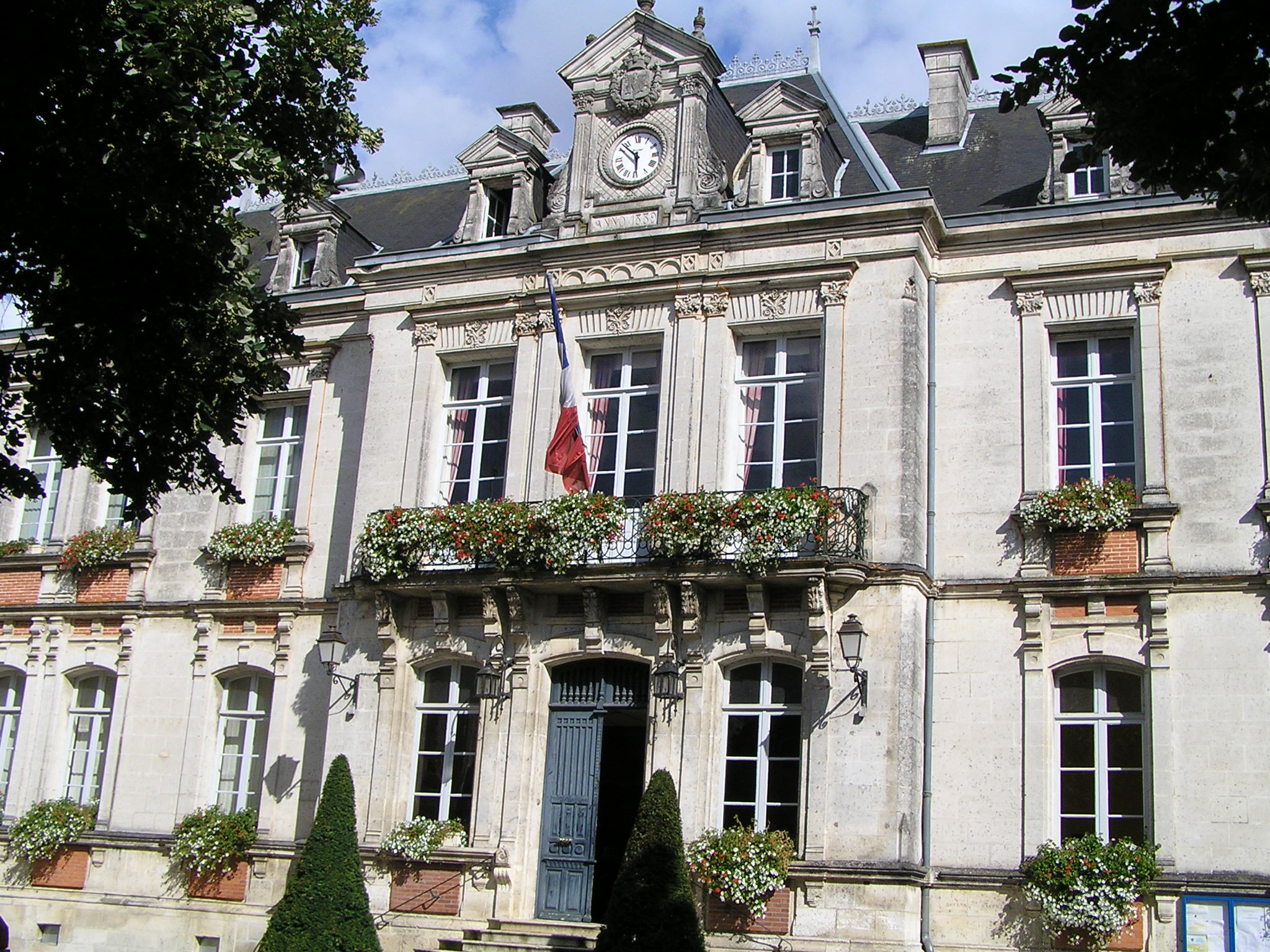
- Town hall

- Coat of arms
- Location of Mansle
- Location within France Location within Nouvelle-Aquitaine
- Coordinates: 45°52′37″N 0°10′46″E
- Country: France
- Region: Nouvelle-Aquitaine
- Department: Charente
- Arrondissement: Confolens
- Canton: Boixe-et-Manslois
- Commune: Mansle-les-Fontaines
- Area^{1}: 5.75 km^{2} (2.22 sq mi)
- Elevation: 60 m (200 ft)
- Highest elevation: 115 m (377 ft)
- Lowest elevation: 55 m (180 ft)
- Population (2022): 1,660
  - Density: 289/km^{2} (748/sq mi)
- Time zone: UTC+01:00 (CET)
  - Summer (DST): UTC+02:00 (CEST)
- Postal code: 16230
- ^{1} French Land Register data, which excludes lakes, ponds, glaciers > 1 km^{2} (0.386 sq mi or 247 acres) and river estuaries.

Mansle (French pronunciation: [mɑ̃l]) is a former commune in the Charente department in southwestern France. It is about 20 km north of Angoulême on the main N10 road. The commune is listed as a Village étape. On 1 January 2023, it was merged into the new commune of Mansle-les-Fontaines.

== Population ==
Historical population

Year	Pop.	±% p.a.
1793	1,250	—
1800	1,231	−0.22%
1806	1,254	+0.31%
1821	1,626	+1.75%
1831	1,785	+0.94%
1841	1,857	+0.40%
1846	1,968	+1.17%
1851	1,919	−0.50%
1856	1,860	−0.62%
1861	1,899	+0.42%
1866	1,900	+0.01%
1872	1,830	−0.62%
1876	1,823	−0.10%
1881	1,825	+0.02%
1886	1,721	−1.17%
1891	1,611	−1.31%
1896	1,537	−0.94%

Year	Pop.	±% p.a.
1901	1,585	+0.62%
1906	1,609	+0.30%
1911	1,587	−0.27%
1921	1,463	−0.81%
1926	1,409	−0.75%
1931	1,424	+0.21%
1936	1,327	−1.40%
1946	1,287	−0.31%
1954	1,271	−0.16%
1962	1,324	+0.51%
1968	1,413	+1.09%
1975	1,595	+1.75%
1982	1,486	−1.01%
1990	1,601	+0.94%
1999	1,597	−0.03%
2006	1,527	−0.64%
2022	1,660	+0.52%

Source: EHESS and INSEE (2022)

== Notable people ==
- Roger Erell

== See also ==
- Communes of the Charente department
