= List of senators of Charente-Maritime =

Location of Charente-Maritime in France

Following is a list of senators of Charente-Maritime, people who have represented the department of Charente-Inférieure or Charente-Maritime in the Senate of France. Charente-Inférieure was one of the 83 original departments created during the French Revolution on 4 March 1790. It was renamed Charente-Maritime on 4 September 1941.

== Third Republic ==
Senators for Charente-Inférieure under the French Third Republic were:

- Jean-Baptiste Boffinton (1876–1885)
- Auguste Roy de Loulay (1876–1885)
- Alfred de Vast-Vimeux (1876–1885)
- Pierre Barbedette (1885–1901)
- Frédéric Mestreau (1885–1891)
- Émile Combes (1885–1921)
- Jean Moinet (1891–1894)
- Eugène Bisseuil (1892–1903)
- Auguste Calvet (1894–1912)
- Paul Rouvier (1901–1912)
- Frédéric Garnier (1903–1905)
- Georges Genet (1906–1919)
- Eugène Réveillaud (1912–1921)
- Gustave Perreau (1912–1939))
- Pierre Landrodie (1920–1922)
- Jean Coyrard (1921–1937)
- Fernand Chapsal (1921–1939)
- Jean-Octave Lauraine (1923–1934)
- René Carré-Bonvalet (1934–1945)
- Maurice Palmade (1938–1945)
- William Bertrand (1939–1945)

== Fourth Republic ==
Senators for Charente-Maritime under the French Fourth Republic were:

- Yves Le Dluz (1946–1948)
- Jean Réveillaud (1948–1955)
- James Sclafer (1948–1955)
- André Dulin (1948–1959)
- Maurice Sauvêtre le 19 juin 1955)
- Jacques Verneuil (1955–1959)

== Fifth Republic ==
Senators for Charente-Maritime under the French Fifth Republic have been:

Name	Took office	Group	Notes
André Dulin	1959–1973	Gauche Démocratique	Died in office 5 March 1973
Lucien Grand	1959–1978	Gauche Démocratique	Died in office 8 May 1978
Jacques Verneuil	1959–1980	not aligned	
Josy Moinet	1973–1989	Rassemblement Démocratique et Européen	From 6 March 1973 in place of André Dulin
Henri Moreau	1978–1980	Gauche Démocratique	From 9 May 1978 in place of Lucien Grand
Michel Rigou	1980–1989	Rassemblement Démocratique et Européen	
Stéphane Bonduel	1980–1989	Rassemblement Démocratique et Européen	
François Blaizot	1989–1998	Union Centriste	
Claude Belot	1989–2014	Union pour un Mouvement Populaire	
Jean-Guy Branger	1998–2008	Rassemblement Démocratique et Européen	
Michel Doublet	1989–2014	Union pour un Mouvement Populaire	Until 24 April 2014 (resigned)
Daniel Laurent	2008–	The Republicans group	
Corinne Imbert	2014–	The Republicans group	
Bernard Lalande	2014–	Socialist and Republican group	

== Sources ==
- Liste des anciens sénateurs de la IIIème République par circonscription (in French), Sénat de France
- Liste des anciens sénateurs de la IVème République par circonscription (in French), Sénat de France
- Liste des anciens sénateurs de la Vème République par circonscription (in French), Sénat de France
- Liste par département - Charente-Maritime (in French), Sénat de France
