= Haentjens =

Haentjens is a surname. Notable people with the surname include:

- Alphonse-Alfred Haentjens (1824–1884), French industrialist and politician
- Brigitte Haentjens, Canadian theatre director
- Charles Haentjens (1821–1874), Haitian diplomat and politician
- Clément Haentjens (1847–1923), Haitian diplomat and politician
- Marcel Haëntjens (1869–1915), French croquet player
