= Asnières-la-Giraud =

- Commune
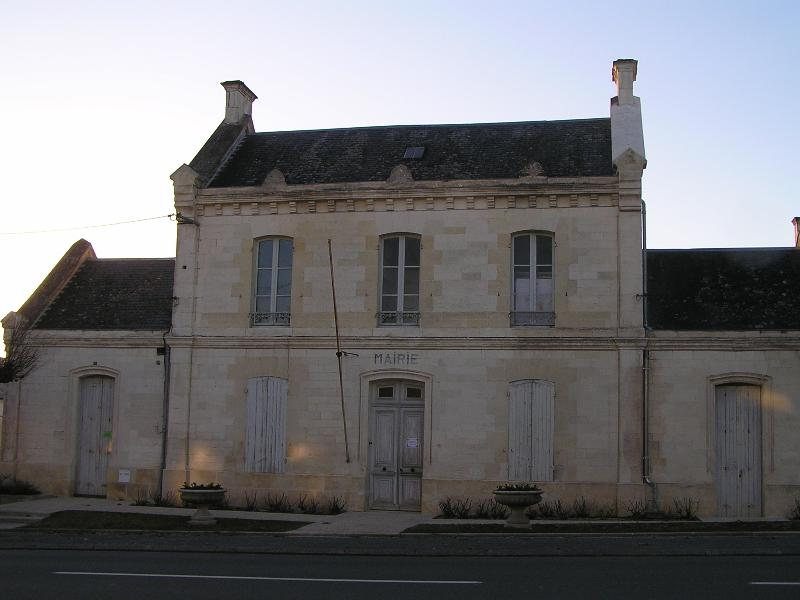
- Town hall
- Location of Asnières-la-Giraud
- Location within France Location within Nouvelle-Aquitaine
- Coordinates: 45°53′N 0°31′W
- Country: France
- Region: Nouvelle-Aquitaine
- Department: Charente-Maritime
- Arrondissement: Saint-Jean-d'Angély
- Canton: Matha
- Intercommunality: CC Vals Saintonge

Government
  - Mayor (2020–2026): Christian Ferru
- Area^{1}: 18.64 km^{2} (7.20 sq mi)
- Elevation: 49 m (161 ft)
- Highest elevation: 82 m (269 ft)
- Lowest elevation: 22 m (72 ft)
- Population (2023): 977
  - Density: 52.4/km^{2} (136/sq mi)
- Time zone: UTC+01:00 (CET)
  - Summer (DST): UTC+02:00 (CEST)
- INSEE/Postal code: 17022 /17400
- ^{1} French Land Register data, which excludes lakes, ponds, glaciers > 1 km^{2} (0.386 sq mi or 247 acres) and river estuaries.

Asnières-la-Giraud (French pronunciation: [ɑnjɛʁ la ʒiʁo]) is a commune in the Charente-Maritime department in the Nouvelle-Aquitaine region of south-western France.

== Geography ==
Asnières-la-Giraud is located some 38 km east of Rochefort and 7 km south of Saint-Jean-d'Angély. Access to the commune is by the D150 road from Saint-Jean-d'Angély in the north which passes through the west of the commune and the village and continues to Saint-Hilaire-de-Villefranche. The D120 road from Saint-Jean-d'Angély passes through the east of the commune and continues to Sainte-Même. The D217 road connects the D120 and the D150 in the commune and continues west to Mazeray. Apart from the village there are the hamlets of La Touzetterie on the north-eastern border, Moulin de la Laigne, La Laigne, Le Plonget, La Giraud, La Rue d'Asnières, Le Puits d'Asnières, Champmiaud, and La Tranche in the south. There are some patches of forest but most of the commune is farmland.

The Loubat river flows south through the commune west of the D150 and through the village before continuing south.

Geologically it is a limestone plateau of the Tithonian period (formerly called Portlandian)

== Administration ==
List of Successive Mayors

| From | To | Name | Party | Position |
|---|---|---|---|---|
| 2001 | 2014 | Guy Madé | | Retired |
| 2014 | 2026 | Christian Ferru | | Retired |
| 2026 | 2033 | Frédéric Baudouin | | |

=== Budget and Taxation ===
The Taxation rates are: 6.28% for housing tax, 11.80% for developed land, 37% for undeveloped land, and 8% business tax. As the community of communes also levies all four taxes: respectively 2.46%, 5.50%, 11.91%, and 3.82%, this gives a total, before the department and the region, of: 8.74% for housing tax, 17.30% for developed land, 48.91% for undeveloped land, and 11.82% business tax (2007 figures).

== Demography ==
The inhabitants of the commune are known as Asnierois or Asnieroises in French.

Historical population

| Year | Pop. | ±% p.a. |
|---|---|---|
| 1793 | 1,093 | — |
| 1800 | 1,087 | −0.08% |
| 1806 | 1,173 | +1.28% |
| 1821 | 1,173 | +0.00% |
| 1831 | 1,274 | +0.83% |
| 1836 | 1,333 | +0.91% |
| 1841 | 1,405 | +1.06% |
| 1846 | 1,338 | −0.97% |
| 1851 | 1,356 | +0.27% |
| 1856 | 1,335 | −0.31% |
| 1861 | 1,389 | +0.80% |
| 1866 | 1,418 | +0.41% |
| 1872 | 1,379 | −0.46% |
| 1876 | 1,327 | −0.96% |
| 1881 | 1,281 | −0.70% |
| 1886 | 1,152 | −2.10% |
| 1891 | 1,130 | −0.38% |
| 1896 | 1,021 | −2.01% |
| 1901 | 1,002 | −0.37% |

| Year | Pop. | ±% p.a. |
|---|---|---|
| 1906 | 967 | −0.71% |
| 1911 | 886 | −1.73% |
| 1921 | 879 | −0.08% |
| 1926 | 891 | +0.27% |
| 1931 | 863 | −0.64% |
| 1936 | 821 | −0.99% |
| 1946 | 768 | −0.67% |
| 1954 | 732 | −0.60% |
| 1962 | 808 | +1.24% |
| 1968 | 767 | −0.86% |
| 1975 | 704 | −1.22% |
| 1982 | 748 | +0.87% |
| 1990 | 817 | +1.11% |
| 1999 | 875 | +0.76% |
| 2007 | 913 | +0.53% |
| 2012 | 941 | +0.61% |
| 2017 | 1,050 | +2.22% |
| 2023 | 977 | −1.19% |

Source: EHESS and INSEE

== Economy ==
Asnières-la-Giraud has always been an agricultural and viticultural; commune. Nevertheless, there are many trades in the commune: a garage, a mechanically construction business, an Emmaus warehouse, and activities linked to tourism with a hotel, a rural cottage, and a Youth Hostel called Chantageasse. The vineyards are in the Appellation d'origine contrôlée (AOC) region of Cognac: the Fins Bois cru.

== Culture and heritage ==
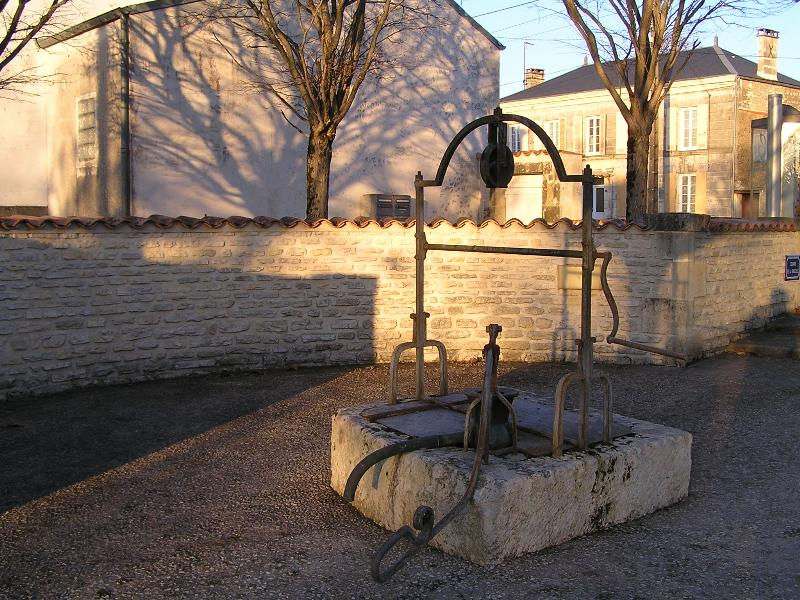
The well

=== Civil heritage ===
- The Fontaines d'Asnières milk factory at 17 Rue de la Laiterie is registered as a historical monument.
- An old well

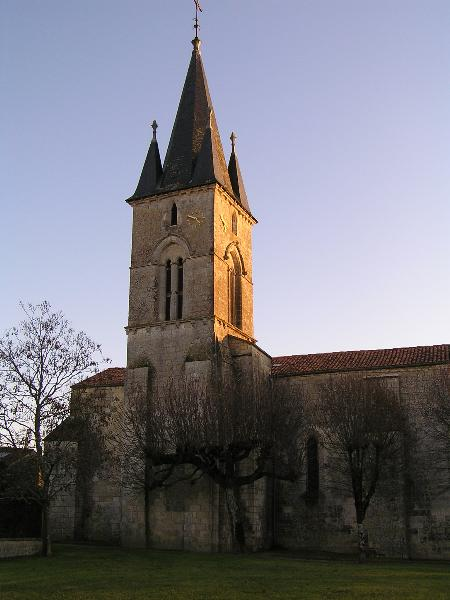
The Church bell tower

=== Religious heritage ===
- The Church of Saint Medard

== Notable people linked to the commune ==
- Auguste Roy de Loulay, French politician born on 26 August 1818 at Asnières-la-Giraud.

== See also ==
- Communes of the Charente-Maritime department
