= Jolibois =

Jolibois is a French surname. Notable people with the surname include:

- Eugène Jolibois (1819–1896), French lawyer and politician
- Georgina Jolibois (born 1968), Canadian politician
