= Eugène Jolibois =

French lawyer and politician

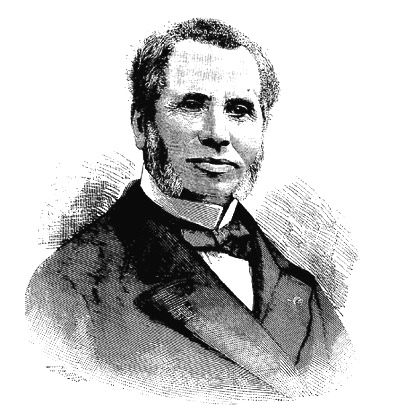
- Jolibois from L'Univers illustré, 5 July juillet 1884

Deputy for Charente-Inférieure
- In office 20 February 1876 – 14 October 1893

Personal details
- Born: 4 June 1819 Amiens, Somme, France
- Died: 20 December 1896 (aged 77) Le Vésinet, Yvelines, France
- Occupation: Lawyer and politician

Eugène Jolibois (4 June 1819 – 20 December 1896) was a French lawyer and politician. He was Bonapartist deputy for Charente-Inférieure from 1876 to 1893.

== Early years ==
Eugène Jolibois was born on 4 June 1819 in Amiens, Somme. His parents were Pierre-François Jolibois and Marie-Anne-Rose Dubois. He obtained a law degree and was a member of the Paris Bar from 1840 to 1849. He became a magistrate, and under the Second French Empire was Advocate General first in Amiens and then in Rouen. In May 1861 he was appointed Attorney General in Chambéry. In April 1863 he became Prefect of Savoie, and in December 1866 was appointed to the Conseil d'État. At the end of 1867 he was considered by the emperor as a candidate for Minister of the Interior.

== Third Republic ==
After the revolution of 4 September 1870 Jolibois returned to private life and again registered at the Paris bar. He was known for his incisive speech during the trials of Bonapartists. In the legislative elections of 20 February 1876 he was sponsored by Baron Eugène Eschassériaux as Bonapartist candidate for the second constituency of Saintes, Charente-Inférieure. In his statement of belief he said he remained loyal to the empire and a firm believer in the Appel au peuple (plebiscite). He would devote his efforts to extending trade treaties and developing free trade. He was narrowly elected by 6,933 votes to 6,536 for Count Anatole Lemercier^{(fr)}. He sat with the Appel au peuple parliamentary group and became one of the leading speakers of the minority. He often made speeches in which he attacked the government, and always voted with the conservative minority. In the 16 May 1877 crisis he supported the government and became a member of the Bonapartist executive committee chaired by Eugène Rouher.

Jolibois was named by Oscar Bardi de Fourtou as official candidate for the second constituency of Saintes in the legislative elections of 14 October 1877, and was reelected by 8,994 votes against 5,758 for the republican Count Lemercier. On 4 November 1877 he also became a member of the General Council of Charente-Inférieure. There was a delay in validation of his election to the Chamber, but on 3 December 1877 it was confirmed. He remained an opponent of the republic and republicans, and spoke repeatedly against the government. He was reelected on 21 August 1881. He was strongly opposed to the domestic and foreign policies of the ministries of Léon Gambetta and Jules Ferry. He often spoke for the minority, and in January 1882 questioned the government on the arrest of Victor, Prince Napoléon.

Jolibois was reelected on 4 October 1885. He spoke in favour of Henri Michelin's proposal for an inquiry into the origins of the Tonkin Campaign. He fought the proposed expulsion of the princes as a member of the committee on this subject. He made a proposal to revise the constitutional laws to restore the plebiscite, and supported General Boulanger's revisionist manifesto. He voted on 11 February 1889 against the reinstatement of the district poll. He voted for the indefinite postponement of the revision of the Constitution proposed by the ministry of Floquet, against the prosecution of three members of the Ligue des Patriotes, against the draft Lisbonne law restricting the freedom of the press and against the prosecution of General Boulanger. While serving as a deputy Jolibois remained a member of the bar.

In the 1889 elections Jolibois ran as a conservative rather than a Bonapartist, although he did not change his position, and was reelected in the first round. He remained a vocal member of the opposition, spoke on a variety of subjects, and was a member of various committees. For several years he was in the budget committee. He was a member of the 1892 committee on the Panama Affair. He did not run for reelection in 1893. His mandate ended on 14 October 1893. Eugène Jolibois died on 20 December 1896 in Le Vésinet, Yvelines.

== Sources ==
- Eugène Jolibois (in French), Assemblée nationale
- Jolly, Jean (1960–1977), "JOLIBOIS, EUGÈNE", Dictionnaire des parlementaires français de 1889 à 1940 (in French), Paris: Éditeur : Presses universitaires de France, ISBN 2-1100-1998-0
- Robert, Adolphe; Cougny, Gaston (1889–1891), "JOLIBOIS (EUGÈNE)", in Edgar Bourloton (ed.), Dictionnaire des Parlementaires français (1789–1889) (in French)
