= Appel au peuple =

French parliamentary group (1872–1889)

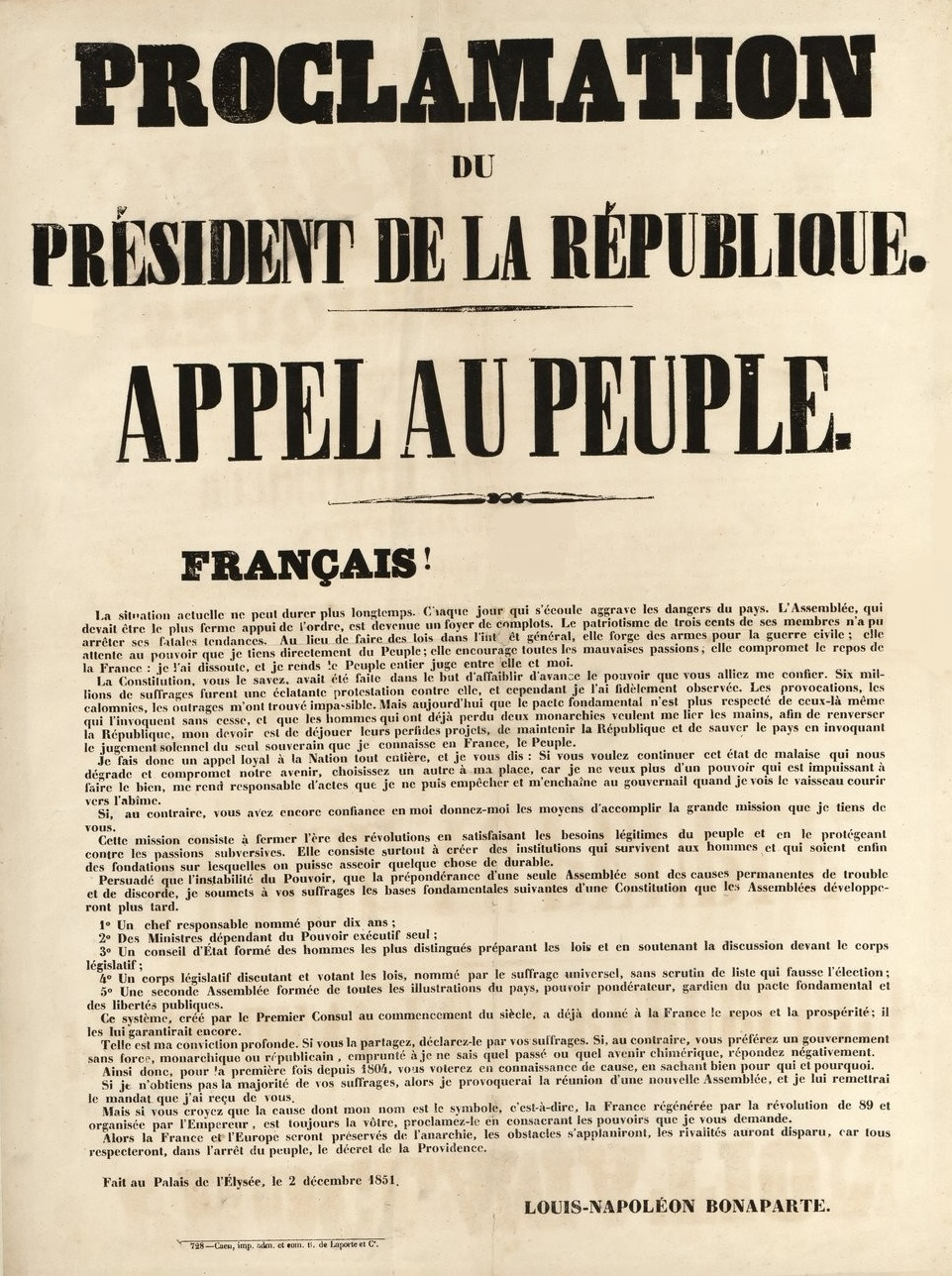
- Proclamation by Louis-Napoléon Bonaparte (later Napoleon III) issued during his 1851 coup d'état. The group took its name from the title.
- Formation: 1872; 154 years ago
- Founded at: Paris
- Dissolved: 1889; 137 years ago
- Merger of: Réunion Générale des Députés de la Droite
- Type: Parliamentary group
- Legal status: Defunct
- Purpose: Promote Bonapartiste policies
- Region served: France
- Official language: French

The Appel au peuple (Plebiscite) was a Bonapartist parliamentary group during the early years of the French Third Republic. They advocated a plebiscite by which the people would choose the form of government, which they assumed would be a revival of the Second French Empire. They were a significant force in the 1870s and 1880s They were associated with Boulangism and the right-wing Ligue des Patriotes. There was a brief revival of the Appel au peuple in the 1900s. Although the members supported universal suffrage, believed in advancement based on merit rather than birth, and had diverse views on other subjects, they were generally conservative. Many of them believed in the virtues of family, religion, free trade and private property.

== Foundation ==
"Appel au Peuple" was the slogan of the Bonapartist party. The Nantes shipowner Alphonse-Alfred Haentjens founded the Appel au Peuple parliamentary group late in 1871 to restore the Second Empire's ideals of democratic imperialism and free trade. He looked for support among the rich winemakers of the southwest of France. Until this time the Bonapartists had concealed their views, but now they openly challenged both the Left and the Right. They claimed that they were more democratic than the Republicans, they mocked the Monarchists and they opposed Adolphe Thiers in his wish to tear up the low-tariff treaties of the empire.

The Bonapartists did not have consistent views on democracy. Their program was deliberately vague, leaving it to the people to choose the form of the regime. The leaders assumed that a plebiscite, as in 1852, would produce a landslide in favour of return to an imperial system, but promised to respect the results of the plebiscite whatever they might be. Eugène Rouher, the emperor's former chief minister, joined the group in February 1872.

== First phase: 1872–1889 ==
The Bonapartists claimed to be a democratic party but failed to effectively win over voters. Between January 1872 and January 1874 they won only five seats in the Assembly: one in Charente-inférieure, two in Pas-de-Calais and two in Corsica. On 16 March 1874 Napoléon, Prince Imperial, son of Napoleon III, spoke at his 18th birthday celebration in favour of an appel au peuple, or plebiscite. He said, "if the name of Napoleon emerges an eighth time from the popular vote, I am prepared to accept the responsibility imposed on me by the national will." Bonapartist candidates now won a series of by-elections starting with that of Philippe La Beaume de Bourgoing in Nièvre on 24 May 1874. Running openly as a member of the Appel au People, Bourgoing won an absolute majority over the combined votes for the Republican and Legitimist candidates. As soon as the results were announced he went to Chislehurst to pay his respects to Eugénie de Montijo.

After Bourgoing's victory a splinter group of Appel au Peuple deputies plotted with retired Bonapartist officers to overthrow the republic. On 9 June 1874 a republican deputy read a circular from the Appel du Peuple central committee to the Chamber. The circular promised to treat retired officers in the territorial army generously, in order to ensure their support. The revelation caused an uproar that was only subdued when the Minister of War, Ernest Courtot de Cissey, said that no serving officers had been involved in the alleged plot.

Between 1881 and 1889 the group participated in the Union des Droites (Union of the Right). In May 1882 Jean-Edmond Laroche-Joubert of the Appel du Peuple proposed voluntary voter registration, with a fixed fine for failure to register of 10% of the tax on liquid assets paid the previous year, or a minimum of 2 francs. The proposal was rejected by the Gauche Republicaine Cirier commission. When the right-wing Ligue des Patriotes was created, members of the Appel au Peuple committee were present at the constitutive general assembly, as were Blanquists, revisionists, members of the Jeunesse Antisémite and members of Jules Guérin's Antisemitic League of France. Louis Le Provost de Launay and Jules de Cuverville, both prominent Bonapartists, were members of the steering committee.

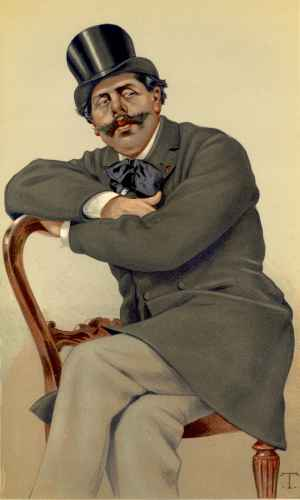
Painting of Paul Cassagnac by Théobald Chartran, 1879

There was some common ground between Bonapartism and radical Boulangism, and Bonapartist leaders such as Prince Jérôme, Prince Victor Napoléon, and Paul Cassagnac thought they could profit from Boulangism. Cassagnac encouraged General Boulanger to launch a coup in July 1887, and was disappointed when he failed to act. In 1888 many Bonapartists joined Paul Déroulède's Ligue des patriotes. The Bonapartists and Déroulède were the most extreme Boulangists. However, Cassagnac did not trust Boulanger. Early in 1889 he welcomed Boulanger's victory in Paris as a defeat of parliamentary democracy, but at other times he stated in his Gers newspaper Appel au peuple that with Boulanger there was a danger of a catastrophic war.

== Later history: 1889–1910 ==
After the 1889 French legislative election, the Appel au peuple parliamentary group was merged into the Réunion Générale des Députés de la Droite (General Meeting of the Deputies of the Right). The Bonapartists adopted a "plebiscitary" stance in 1891 in an attempt to reaffirm the party's basis in revolutionary principles. However, in the 1893 French legislative election, the party was reduced to only 13 seats in the chamber. Many of the provincial newspapers closed, and the Appel au Peuple was suspended.

The Bonapartists reorganized in 1903 and formed an Appel au Peuple central committee headed by the Marquis Jules-Albert de Dion. Other leaders of the revived movement were Paul Cassagnac the younger, Le Provost de Launay and Pierre Taittinger, who would later become the leader of the Jeunesses Patriotes and then of the Juenesses plébiscitaires. The new Appel au Peuple continued to support the Bonapartist pretender, but combined Bonapartist concepts with authoritarianism and plebiscitism. After 1903 the revived Appel au Peuple opposed the pro-dynastic L'Autorité and the Comité politique plebiscitaire. The Appel au Peuple was less hostile to elections than the Action Française, with whom its members often brawled, but cooperated with the Ligue des patriotes, which was becoming increasingly moderate.

Eventually the Groupe des Droites, combining Bonapartists and monarchists, was formed from 1910 to 1919.

== Ideology ==
The Bonapartist appel au peuple concept in theory rooted power in the people, although in fact the leaders were more interested in manipulating public opinion than in following it. However, the Bonapartist philosophy was more than simply using radical means to achieve conservative ends. Some of the leaders were populists who mingled with the people and respected their right to social mobility based on talent or merit. This contrasted with the monarchists, who expected the common people to defer to the upper classes and aristocracy.

The Bonapartists disagreed on tactics, policy and ideology. They wanted an authoritarian democracy, but could not agree on whether it should be of the left or the right. The divisions in the party were shown by the fact that Pierre Magne chose to join the cabinet of Albert de Broglie, whom most of the party despised, and that Prince Napoléon of the party's left wing did not attend the Chislehurst ceremony where the Prince Imperial was declared a full pretender. Most Bonapartists were nevertheless conservative, emphasising that the foundation of society was the family, religion and property, and the people should respect the social authorities.

The effect was to cause some confusion between the Bonapartist and monarchist (legitimist or Orléanist) groups, who sometimes worked together to avoid splitting the vote in elections. In other cases they were bitter enemies. In Gers the royalist newspaper Le Conservateur et le Gers réunis wrote in 1876 that the Bonapartist Cassagnac family preached "the people's rights to wealth, which is pure socialism ... these two men, father and son, who presume to subject the department of Gers to their doctrines, their complots, and their low intrigues." The editor of the Bonapartist newspaper L'appel au peuple in Gers wrote, "With the [Bourbon] white flag you have the return of the old privileges; you have the suppression of universal suffrage; you will go back to the epoch when the very rich and noble alone had the right to participate in public affairs, in a word, had alone the right to vote."

== Third Republic deputies ==
Deputies in the group during the Third Republic included:

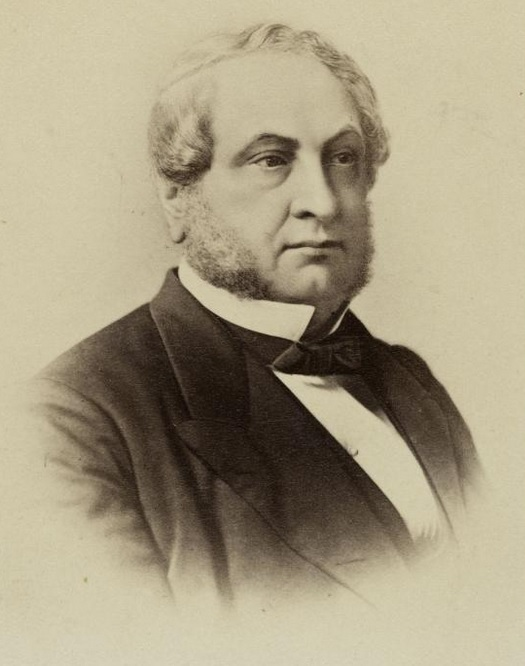
Eugène Rouher, early leader of the Appel au Peuple group

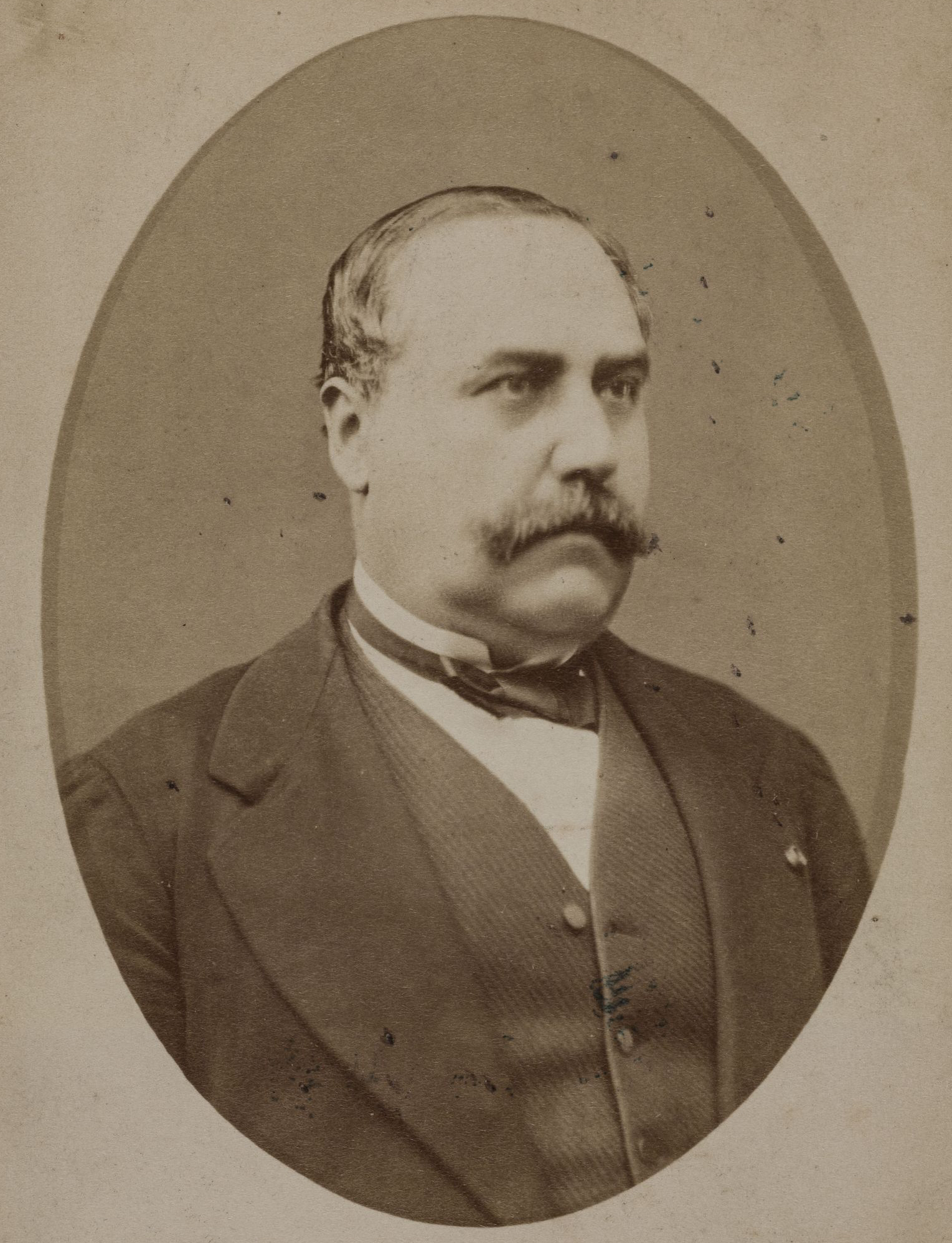
Baron Eschassériaux, president of the group in 1874

Name	Deputy of	In office	Notes
Jean-Charles Abbatucci	Corsica	1872–1881	
Jean-Baptiste Boffinton	Charente-Inférieure	1873–1876	
François-Xavier Joseph de Casabianca	Corsica	1876–1877	
Ernest Arrighi de Casanova	Corsica	1876–1881	
Gustave Cunéo d'Ornano	Charente	1876–1906	
Jérôme David	Gironde	1876–1881	
Eugène Eschassériaux	Charente-Inférieure	1871–1893	president of the group in 1874
Jérôme Galloni d'Istria	Corsica	1871–1876	
Albert Gauthier de Clagny	Seine-et-Oise	1889–1910	
Louis Gautier	Charente	1876–1880	
René François Gautier	Charente	1880–1898	
Denis Gavini	Corsica	1871–1885	
François Hamille	Pas-de-Calais	1871–1885	
Alphonse-Alfred Haentjens	Sarthe	1871–1883	
Eugène Jolibois	Charente-Inférieure	1876–1893	
Joseph Lachaud de Loqueyssie	Tarn-et-Garonne	1877–1881	
Jean-Edmond Laroche-Joubert	Charente	1871–1884	
Arthur Legrand	Manche	1871–1916	former president of the group
Charles-Alphonse Levert	Pas-de-Calais	1872–1889	
Joachim Joseph André Murat	Lot	1871–1889	
Adrien Joseph Prax-Paris	Tarn-et-Garonne	1871–1902	
Edgar Raoul-Duval	Seine-Inférieure	1871–1887	
René Reille	Tarn	1876–1898	
Eugène Rouher	Puy-de-Dôme	1872–1881	
Auguste Roy de Loulay	Charente-Inférieure	1871–1876	
Alfred de Vast-Vimeux	Charente-Inférieure	1871–1876	

== Sources ==
- "Appel au Peuple", France Politique (in French)
- Burns, Michael (2014-07-14), Rural Society and French Politics: Boulangism and the Dreyfus Affair, 1886-1900, Princeton University Press, ISBN 978-1-4008-5338-0
- Chapman, Guy (1962-06-18), Third Republic of France, Palgrave Macmillan UK, ISBN 978-1-349-00463-8
- Gildea, Robert (2008), Children of the Revolution: The French, 1799-1914, Harvard University Press, ISBN 978-0-674-03209-5
- Grubb, Alan (1996), The Politics of Pessimism: Albert de Broglie and Conservative Politics in the Early Third Republic, University of Delaware Press, ISBN 978-0-87413-575-6
- Hanson, Stephen E. (2010-07-05), Post-Imperial Democracies: Ideology and Party Formation in Third Republic France, Weimar Germany, and Post-Soviet Russia, Cambridge University Press, ISBN 978-1-139-49149-5
- Locke, Robert R. (2015-03-08), French Legitimists and the Politics of Moral Order in the Early Third Republic, Princeton University Press, ISBN 978-1-4008-7013-4
- Malkopoulou, Anthoula (2014-12-05), The History of Compulsory Voting in Europe: Democracy's Duty?, Routledge, ISBN 978-1-317-69334-5
- Passmore, Kevin (2013), The Right in France from the Third Republic to Vichy, OUP Oxford, ISBN 978-0-19-965820-6
- Tombs, Robert (2003-09-02), Nationhood and Nationalism in France: From Boulangism to the Great War 1889-1918, Routledge, ISBN 978-1-134-99796-1
