= Gustave Cunéo d'Ornano =

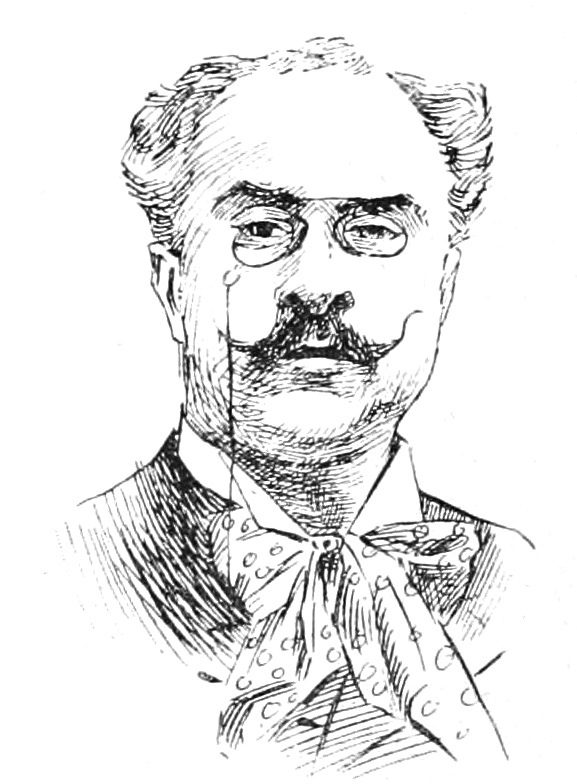
- Cunéo d'Ornano from Le Monde moderne, December 1898

Deputy for Charente
- In office 5 March 1876 – 17 May 1906

Personal details
- Born: Gustave Léon Eugène Cunéo d'Ornano; 15 November 1845 Rome, Papal States
- Died: 17 May 1906 (aged 60) Paris, France
- Occupation: Lawyer, journalist, politician

Gustave Cunéo d'Ornano (15 November 1845 – 17 May 1906) was a French lawyer, journalist and politician who was a Bonapartist deputy for the department of Charente for thirty years. He represented the rural constituency of Cognac, and often supported the distillers in parliament. Although he supported democracy, he was in favour of plebiscites and opposed the republicans of the French Third Republic for most of his career. He took every opportunity to speak out against the government in the chamber of deputies. At one point an article he had written led to a duel with another deputy.

== Early years ==
Gustave Cunéo d'Ornano was born on 15 November 1845 in Rome. His grandfather was a former comrade-in-arms of Napoleon who remained attached to the Bonaparte family. His parents were François Joseph Antoine Cunéo d'Ornano (1798–1863), former officer and prefecture councilor, and Adélaïde Françoise Dyonnet. He attended the Collège Stanislas de Paris, run by the Marianists, as did the Royalist pretender and his main spokesman in the Chamber of Deputies, Fernand de Ramel^{(fr)}. He studied law and received a license. During the Second French Empire he was employed by the Prefecture of the Seine. During the Siege of Paris (1870–71) he served in Paris as a lieutenant in a battalion of Garde Mobile. He then joined the army of the Versailles government, and helped suppress the Paris Commune.

== Journalist ==
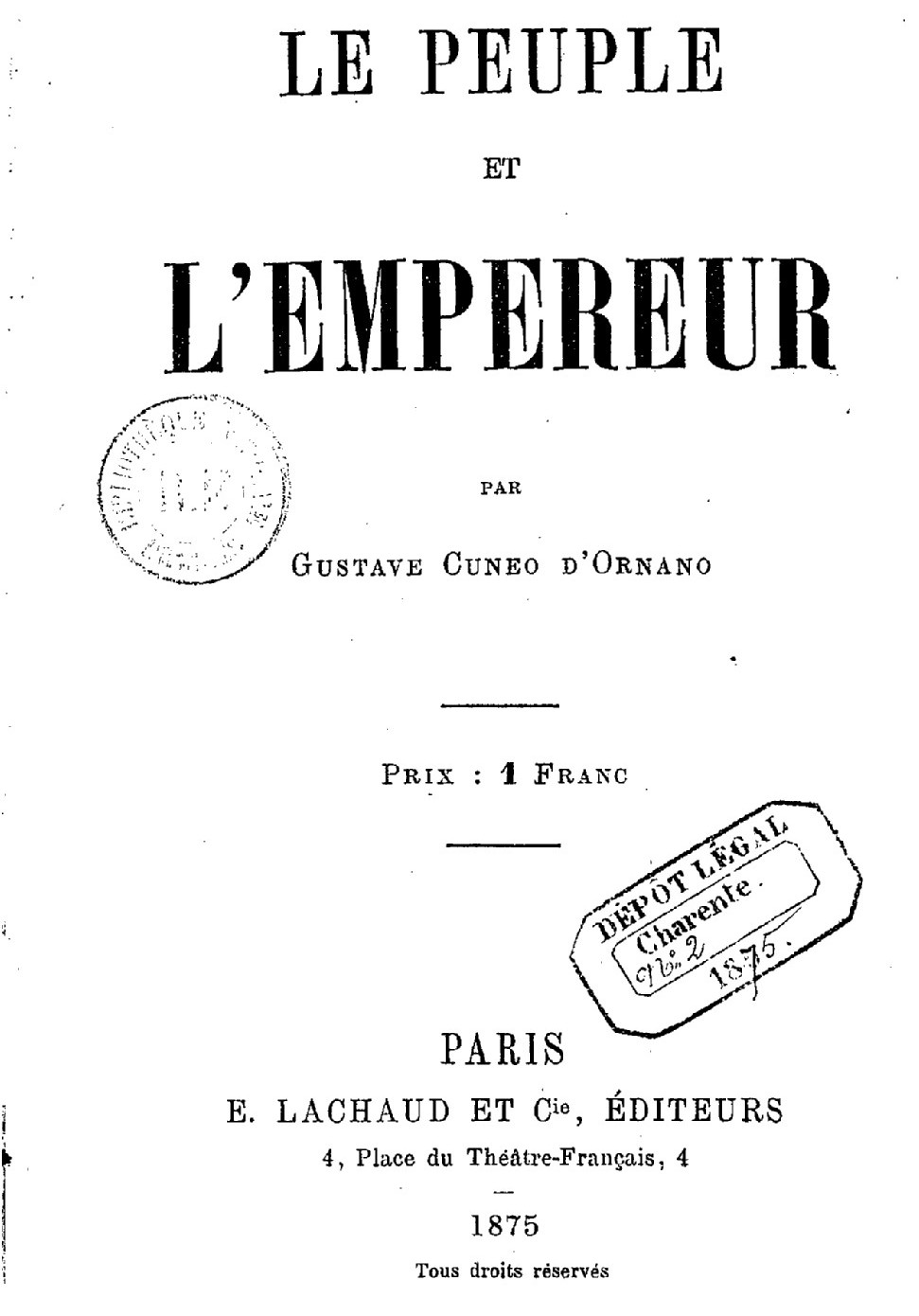
Cover of Le peuple et l'empereur Cunéo (1875)

In 1872 Cuneo d'Ornano became one of the editors of the Courrier de France. From 1873 to 1874 he edited the Charentais in Angoulême. After contributing to la Presse for a short period, he returned to Charente and founded a Bonapartist newspaper, the Suffrage universel des Charentes, and became known for his extremely lively polemics. In 1876, in Bassac, Charente, he married Marie-Léontine-Claire-Sara Plantevigne-Dubosquet. They had one son, born in 1883, who was held on the baptismal font by Victor, Prince Napoléon.

== Politician ==
Cunéo d'Ornano had a combative personality and great powers as a speaker and a journalist. He was not interested in the return of the Empire so much as in a plebiscitary republic modelled on the French Consulate of 1799–1804 with universal suffrage and an elected president. He was a determined opponent of the parliamentary system of the Third Republic. Despite being an outsider born far away, and despite being a conservative Bonapartist intellectual, he won great affection from the common people of the Charente countryside and was elected ten times in a row by the voters of the Cognac district.

Cunéo d'Ornano was one of the most prominent leaders of the Bonapartist party in Charente during the 1876 legislative elections. He engaged in noisy demonstrations against the republican government, and was elected to the Chamber of Deputies for the Cognac district of Charente in the second round of voting. There were many protests against the election, which was invalidated by the House on 5 April 1876 due to defamatory posters and attacks on the constitution. He was reelected with an improved majority on 21 May 1876. He sat with the Appel au peuple parliamentary group, consistently voted with the monarchical minority and often intervened in debates. In 1876, as a result of an article published in his le Suffrage universel, Cunéo d'Ornano fought a duel with André Duclaud^{(fr)}, a republican deputy in Charente. Cunéo d'Ornano supported the act of 16 May 1877 and supported the policy of the Broglie-Fourtou government.

As official candidate in the 14 October 1877 elections he famously stated in his profession of faith that he would make "the republic and the republicans a meal that even dogs would not eat." He was elected by 9,911 votes to 7,704 for the republican candidate. In the Chamber he continued his opposition and interruptions in debates, and was often called to order. He voted against the election of Jules Grévy as President of France, against the law on freedom of the press, and constantly fought for the appel au peuple (referendum). On 8 December 1878 he attacked the persecution of La Jeune Garde by the government, saying, "there is no liberty if it does not exist equally for everyone". He said the republican government allowed shameful caricatures against religion and past regimes, but banned drawings that targeted republican officials.

Cunéo d'Ornano was reelected on 21 August 1881 by 8,621 votes against 8,132 votes for the republican candidate. He voted against the abrogation of the Concordat of 1801, against the cabinet of Jules Ferry and against the Tonkin credits. On 24 May 1881 he spoke out in the debate over the Treaty of Bardo that established a French protectorate over Tunisia. He stated that the government, in fighting a small war without being authorized by parliament, had violated Article 9 of the constitution which was designed to prevent such authoritarian action. The government had lied about its intent to annex the country even after the annexation had become a fact.

In February 1883 Cunéo d'Ornano fought Charles Floquet's proposals to exile the members of former ruling families from French territory, and appealed against the arrest of Jérôme Napoléon. That year he tried without success to introduce an amendment to the constitution to allow plebiscites. He was reelected on 4 October 1885 for Charente on the conservative list. Once again he took every opportunity in the House to state his opposition to the government. Towards the end of the legislature he voted against reinstatement of the district poll, for indefinite postponement of revision to the constitution, against prosecution of three members of the Ligue des Patriotes, against the draft Lisbonne law restricting freedom of the press and against the prosecution of General Boulanger.

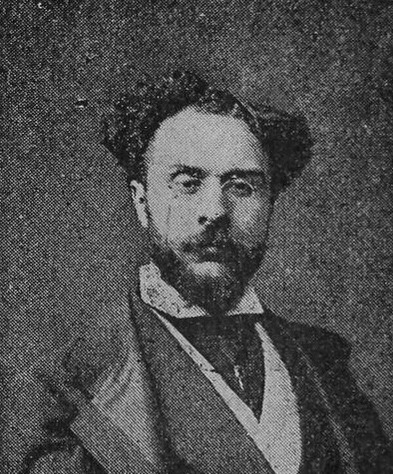
Cunéo d'Ornano from Nos Députés (1894)

By the time of the elections of 22 September 1889 Cuneo d'Ornano had become less extreme and said he no longer wished to overthrow the republic as long as it became democratic and submitted to a national plebiscite. He ran as a "Bonapartist and Revisionist" for his former district of Cognac and was reelected by 8,811 votes to 7,705 for the republican candidate. He again sat with the partisans of the Appel au peuple. On the subject of alcohol he often defended the liberty of the distillers and fought against the surtax on alcohol and controls on its sale. He was reelected in the first round on 20 August 1893. In the new legislature he submitted many proposals in favour of the distilleries.

After the publication on 13 January 1898 of Émile Zola's open letter J'accuse…! attacking antisemites during the Dreyfus affair, Cunéo d'Ornano was one of a long list of Nationalist leaders who signed an appeal posted on the walls of Paris that urged the people to take to the streets to show their support for the army and opposition to the Jewish syndicate that was trying to undermine it. He was reelected in the first round on 8 May 1898 and on 27 April 1902. He was elected for the last time on 6 May 1906. Gustave Cunéo d'Ornano died of a stroke in Paris on 17 May 1906 before taking his seat in the new legislature.

== Publications ==
Cunéo d'Ornano made numerous speeches, proposals and reports as a deputy. Other publications include:

- Gustave Cunéo d'Ornano (1875), Le peuple et l'empereur, Paris: E. Lachaud et Cie, p. 65
- Gustave Cunéo d'Ornano (1875), Réponse au gérant du "Charentais", Angoulême: chez tous les libraires, p. 24
- Gustave Cunéo d'Ornano (24 July 1879), Le Prince Napoléon et ses doctrines (speech given in Bassac), Paris: V. Daireaux, p. 47
- Gustave Cunéo d'Ornano (1880), Un grand magistrat M. de Royer, Paris: Imprimerie Tolmer & cie, p. 69
- Gustave Cunéo d'Ornano (12 February 1882), La Politique des principes (speech given in Segonzac), Angoulême: bureaux du "Suffrage universel", p. 30
- Gustave Cunéo d'Ornano (7 January 1883), L'Appel au peuple (speech given in Lyon), Paris: chez tous les libraires, p. 30
- Gustave Cunéo d'Ornano; Charles-Philippe Flament (1890), Les Associations religieuses et le fisc, Paris: Dentu, p. 57
- Gustave Cunéo d'Ornano (1894), La République de Napoléon, Paris: P. Ollendorff, p. 636
- Gustave Cunéo d'Ornano (15 February 1895), "Gambetta plébiscitaire", Nouvelle Revue, Paris: L. Sauvaitre: 24
- Gustave Cunéo d'Ornano (1900), Napoléon, l'homme, sa république, paix sociale

== Sources ==
- Barbier, Dominique, Gustave Léon Eugène CUNEO d'ORNANO (in French)
- Fuller, Robert Lynn (2012-04-19), The Origins of the French Nationalist Movement, 1886–1914, McFarland, ISBN 978-0-7864-9025-7
- Gildea, Robert (2008-07-31), Children of the Revolution: The French, 1799-1914, Penguin Books Limited, ISBN 978-0-14-191852-5
- Goldstein, Robert Justin (1989), Censorship of Political Caricature in Nineteenth-century France, Kent State University Press, ISBN 978-0-87338-396-7
- Gustave Cunéo d'Ornano (in French), Assemblée nationale
- Gustave Cunéo d'Ornano (1845-1906) - Auteur du texte (in French), BnF: Bibliotheque nationale de France
- Jolly, Jean (1960–1977), "CUNÉO D'ORNANO, GUSTAVE", Dictionnaire des parlementaires français de 1889 à 1940 (in French), Paris: Éditeur : Presses universitaires de France, ISBN 2-1100-1998-0
- Larkin, Maurice (2002-08-22), Religion, Politics and Preferment in France Since 1890: La Belle Epoque and Its Legacy, Cambridge University Press, ISBN 978-0-521-52270-0
- Review: Gustave Cuneo d'Ornano – Le dernier bonapartiste charentais (in French)
- Robert, Adolphe; Cougny, Gaston (1889–1891), "CUNÉO D'ORNANO (GUSTAVE)", in Edgar Bourloton (ed.), Dictionnaire des Parlementaires français (1789–1889) (in French)
- Thomas, Martin; Toye, Richard (2017-03-09), Arguing about Empire: Imperial Rhetoric in Britain and France, 1882-1956, OUP Oxford, ISBN 978-0-19-106609-2
