= Jérôme Galloni d'Istria =

French politician

Jérôme Galloni d'Istria (20 January 1815 in Olmeto – 14 April 1890) was a French Bonapartist politician. He was a member of the National Assembly from 1871 to 1876, sitting with the Appel au peuple parliamentary group, and a Senator from 1876 to 1885.
