= François Hamille =

French politician

François Hamille (3 September 1812, Montreuil-sur-Mer - 20 November 1885) was a French Bonapartist politician. He was a member of the National Assembly from 1871 to 1876 and of the Chamber of Deputies from 1876 to 1885, sitting with the Appel au peuple parliamentary group, and a Senator in 1885.
