= Auguste Roy de Loulay =

French advocate and politician

Pierre-Auguste Roy de Loulay
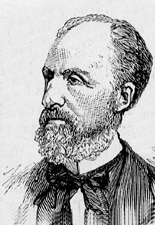

Deputy for Charente-Inférieure
- In office 31 May 1863 – 4 September 1870

Representative for Charente-Inférieure
- In office 8 February 1871 – 7 March 1876

Senator for Charente-Inférieure
- In office 30 January 1876. – 24 January 1885

Personal details
- Born: Pierre-Auguste Roy; 26 August 1818 Asnières, Charente-Inférieure, France
- Died: 21 February 1896 (aged 77) Paris, France
- Occupation: Advocate and politician

Pierre-Auguste Roy de Loulay (26 August 1818 – 21 February 1896) was a French advocate and politician who was a deputy in the Second French Empire and the French Third Republic, and was then a senator.

== Early years ==
Pierre-Auguste Roy was born on 26 August 1818 in Asnières, Charente-Inférieure. He studied law, obtained his license and entered the bar of Saint-Jean-d'Angély, where he mainly dealt with financial matters. After the February Revolution, in 1848 he was appointed General Councilor of Charente-Inférieure for the canton of Loulay. He was elected president of the Saint-Jean-d'Angély Agricultural Society.

== Second Empire ==
Roy de Loulay became mayor of the town of Loulay, a few kilometers from Saint-Jean-d'Angély. He ran as government candidate for election to the Corps législatif as deputy for the fourth constituency of Charent-Inferieure to replace the viscount Anatole Lemercier^{(fr)}, who was running for reelection. Roy was elected on 31 May 1863 and sat with the dynastic majority. He won 17,293 votes to 5,973 for Lemercier and 5,900 for a M. Simonnent. He was interested in all questions that affected the agriculture and viniculture in his district.

On 4 April 1866 an imperial decree authorized Auguste Roy to change his surname to Roy de Loulay. Auguste Roy de Loulay was made a Knight of the Legion of Honour on 30 August 1868. He was reelected on 23 May 1869 and sat with the center right. He voted for the war with Prussia. He left office when the Third Republic was declared on 4 September 1870. Roy and Baron Eugène Eschassériaux offered to organize national defense for the new government, but their offer was declined.

== Third Republic ==
Auguste Roy de Loulay was elected a representative for Charente-Inférieure on 8 February 1871, holding office until 7 March 1876. He sat with the Appel au peuple parliamentary group. His fellow deputies for Charente, Eugène Eschassériaux and Alfred de Vast-Vimeux also sat with the Appel au peuple. He was one of five deputies who protested the degradation of Napoleon III. He joined the deputies in favour of free trade, voted for peace, voted to repeal the laws of exile, voted for the resignation of Adolphe Thiers, against the ministry of Albert de Broglie and against the constitutional laws. Roy de Loulay voted for public prayers, He voted against Henri-Alexandre Wallon's proposed amendment to the constitutional laws, and against the law on higher education. On several occasions he left the Right and voted with the Left. He does not seem to have made any speeches in the Assembly.

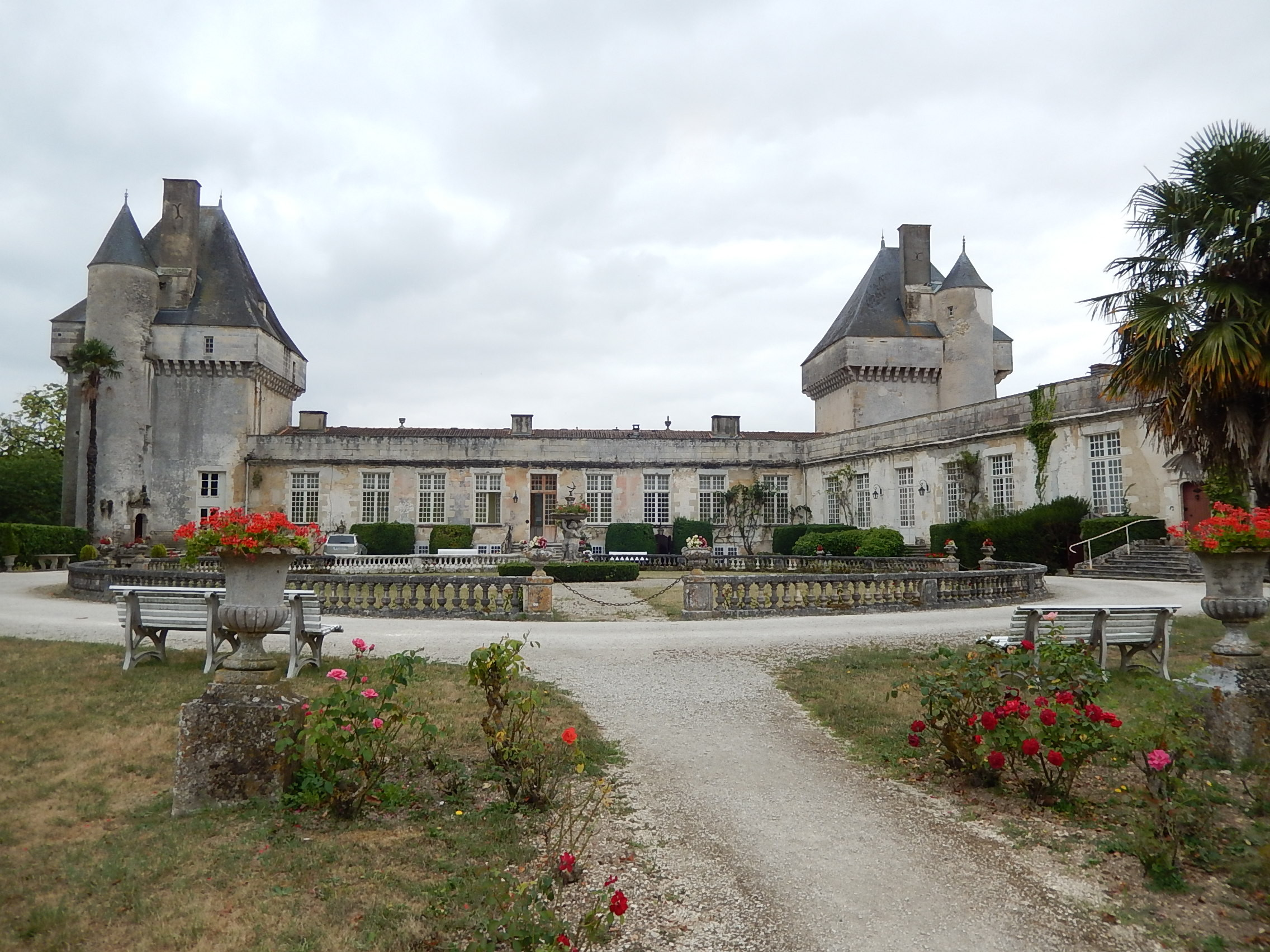
Château de Mornay

Roy de Loulay was reelected general councilor for the canton of Loulay. In 1876 he campaigned to be elected to the senate. During his campaign Roy de Loulay and the former deputies Jean-Baptiste Boffinton and Alfred de Vast-Vimeux signed a circular in which they declared,

"In the day of peril, on the 24th of May, we have placed Marshal MacMahon in power, that is to say that respecting the rights conferred on him by the Constitution we shall support with all our energy the government which has so clearly affirmed its desire to combat the spread of anti-social doctrines and revolutionary programs. But when the time comes to revise the Constitution, as supporters of the appel au peuple (plebiscite), we will demand the right of the nation to pronounce directly on the form of its government."

Roy de Loulay was elected Senator for Charente-Inférieure on 30 January 1876. He voted for the dissolution of the chamber requested by the Broglie government. Roy de Loulay left office on 24 January 1885. After failing to be reelected Auguste Roy de Loulay gave all his attention to his Château de Mornay^{(fr)}, which he made into a virtual museum. He continued to serve in the General Council of Charente-Inférieure, which he had entered in 1848, until his sudden death on 21 February 1896 in Paris. His son Louis Roy de Loulay was deputy of Charente-Inférieure from 1876 to 1889 and from 1898 to 1902.

== Sources ==
- Auguste, Pierre Roy de Loulay (in French), Assemblée nationale
- Clère, Jules (1876), "ROY DE LOULAY (PIERRE-AUGUSTE)", Biographie complète des sénateurs (in French), Garnier
- Gammal, Jean El (1999), Politique et poids du passé dans la France "fin de siècle" (in French), Presses Univ. Limoges, ISBN 978-2-84287-121-5
- Jolly, Jean (1960–1977), "ROY DE LOULAY, AUGUSTE, PIERRE", Dictionnaire des parlementaires français de 1889 à 1940 (in French), Paris: Éditeur : Presses universitaires de France, ISBN 2-1100-1998-0
- Ribeyre, Félix (1864), Les Grands Corps de l'État. Le Corps Législatif 1863-1869. Biographie des Députés, etc (in French)
- Robert, Adolphe; Cougny, Gaston (1889–1891), "ROY DE LOULAY (PIERRE-AUGUSTE)", in Edgar Bourloton (ed.), Dictionnaire des Parlementaires français (1789–1889) (in French)
- "ROY DE LOULAY Pierre Auguste", Leonore (in French)
- ROY DE LOULAY Pierre (in French), Sénat de France
