= Alfred de Vast-Vimeux =

French soldier and Bonapartist politician

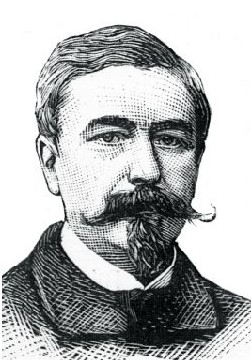

Deputy for Charente-Inférieure
- In office 27 November 1859 – 4 September 1870

Representative for Charente-Inférieure
- In office 8 February 1871 – 7 March 1876

Senator of Charente-Inférieure
- In office 30 January 1876 – 24 January 1885

Deputy of Charente-Inférieure
- In office 18 October 1885 – 20 July 1888

Personal details
- Born: Charles-Antoine-Honoré-Alfred, Baron de Vast-Vimeux; 8 July 1826 Lunéville, Meurthe, France
- Died: 20 July 1888 (aged 62) Château de Péré, Péré, Charente-Inférieure, France
- Occupation: Soldier, politician

Baron Alfred de Vast-Vimeux (8 July 1826 – 20 July 1888) was a French soldier and Bonapartist politician who represented the department of Charente-Inférieure as a deputy during the Second French Empire and in the legislature and the senate of the French Third Republic.

== Early years (1826–1851) ==
Charles-Antoine-Honoré-Alfred, Baron de Vast-Vimeux was born on 8 July 1826 in Lunéville, Meurthe. His father was Charles de Vast-Vimeux^{(fr)} (1787–1859), deputy for Charente-Maritime from 1849 to 1859. His mother was Louise de Mauclerc (1802–1883). He studied at the Prytanée de La Flèche from 1837 to 1843. On 15 October 1844 he volunteered for the 12th dragoons, which were commanded by his father. He became brigadier fourrier (supply sergeant) on 15 April 1845 and maréchal des logis (sergeant) on 15 October 1845.

Vast-Vimeux was admitted to the École spéciale militaire de Saint-Cyr on 15 December 1845. He was appointed second lieutenant of the 74th line infantry on 1 October 1847. He joined the cavalry, and on 20 December 1847 was sent to the École Nationale d'Équitation at Saumur as an officer cadet. He graduated on 1 October 1849 as second lieutenant in the Chasseurs d'Afrique. He was named a lieutenant on 6 December 1850.

== Second Empire (1852–1870) ==
Vast-Vimeux was promoted to captain on 5 March 1852. In this rank he was an officier d'ordonnance (junior ADC) of Napoleon III. He also became a member of the General Council of Charente-Inférieure for the canton of Aigrefeuille. On 7 February 1856 in Paris he married Angélique Augustine de Rémont (c. 1835–1913). They had two children, Fernande (1856–1927) and Raoul (1860–1897).

When his father died in 1859 Vast-Vimeux ran for election for his father's seat in the legislature. He was elected to the Corps législatif on 27 November 1859 for Charente-Inférieure, and sat with the dynastic majority. He resigned from the army in 1860. He was made a Knight of the Legion of Honour on 14 August 1862. He was reelected on 31 May 1863 and 23 May 1869, when he sat with the center-right group.

Vast-Vimeux returned to the army during the Franco-Prussian War of 1870 as colonel of the 8th regiment of Gardes mobiles of Charente-Inférieure. His term in the legislature ended on 4 September 1870 when the Third Republic was declared. He fought with the Armée de la Loire in the 1st Infantry Brigade and the 1st Division of 16th Corps. He was promoted to Officer of the Legion of Honour on 9 January 1871.

== Third Republic (1871–1888) ==
Vast-Vimeux was elected to the National Assembly on 8 February 1871 for Charente-Inférieure, and sat with the Appel au peuple parliamentary group. He voted for peace with Germany, for repeal of the laws exiling the princes, for the resignation of Adolphe Thiers, against the ministry of Albert de Broglie, against the proposition for the establishment of the Republic of Henri-Alexandre Wallon and against the constitutional laws. He left office on 7 March 1876. He then ran for election to the senate. During his campaign for the senate Vast-Vimeux and the former deputies Auguste Roy de Loulay and Jean-Baptiste Boffinton signed a circular in which they declared,

"In the day of peril, on the 24th of May, we have placed Marshal MacMahon in power, that is to say that respecting the rights conferred on him by the Constitution we shall support with all our energy the government which has so clearly affirmed its desire to combat the spread of anti-social doctrines and revolutionary programs. But when the time comes to revise the Constitution, as supporters of the appel au peuple (plebiscite), we will demand the right of the nation to pronounce directly on the form of its government."

Vast-Vimeux was elected to the Senate for Charente-Inférieure on 30 January 1876. He sat with the Bonapartist minority, and voted for the dissolution of the House demanded by the cabinet in the 16 May 1877 crisis. He failed to be reelected in 1885. His term ended on 24 January 1885. Vast-Vimeux was elected to the Chamber of Deputies on 18 October 1885, holding office until 20 July 1888, again sitting with the Appel au peuple. Alfred de Vast-Vimeux died in office on 20 July 1888 in the Château de Péré, in Péré, Charente-Inférieure.

== Sources ==
- Alfred, Charles, Antoine, Honoré Vast-Vimeux (in French), Assemblée nationale
- Clère, Jules (1876), Biographie complète des sénateurs (in French), Garnier
- de VAST-VIMEUX Charles (in French), Senate of France
- Garric, Alain, Alfred VAST-VIMEUX (in French)
- Robert, Adolphe; Cougny, Gaston (1889–1891), "VAST-VIMEUX (CHARLES-ANTOINE-HONORÉ-ALFRED, BARON DE)", in Edgar Bourloton (ed.), Dictionnaire des Parlementaires français (1789–1889) (in French)
