= La Frédière =

- Part of Saint-Hilaire-de-Villefranche
- Location of La Frédière
- Location within France Location within Nouvelle-Aquitaine
- Coordinates: 45°52′01″N 0°34′44″W
- Country: France
- Region: Nouvelle-Aquitaine
- Department: Charente-Maritime
- Arrondissement: Saint-Jean-d'Angély
- Canton: Chaniers
- Commune: Saint-Hilaire-de-Villefranche
- Area^{1}: 2.89 km^{2} (1.12 sq mi)
- Elevation: 50 m (160 ft)
- Highest elevation: 66 m (217 ft)
- Lowest elevation: 13 m (43 ft)
- Population (2023): 73
  - Density: 25/km^{2} (65/sq mi)
- Time zone: UTC+01:00 (CET)
  - Summer (DST): UTC+02:00 (CEST)
- Postal code: 17770
- ^{1} French Land Register data, which excludes lakes, ponds, glaciers > 1 km^{2} (0.386 sq mi or 247 acres) and river estuaries.

La Frédière (French pronunciation: [la fʁedjɛʁ]) is a former commune in the Charente-Maritime department in southwestern France. On 1 January 2019, it was merged into the commune Saint-Hilaire-de-Villefranche.

== See also ==
- Communes of the Charente-Maritime department
