= Abbey of Notre-Dame de La Couronne =

Monastery in ruins

Abbey Notre-Dame de La Couronne
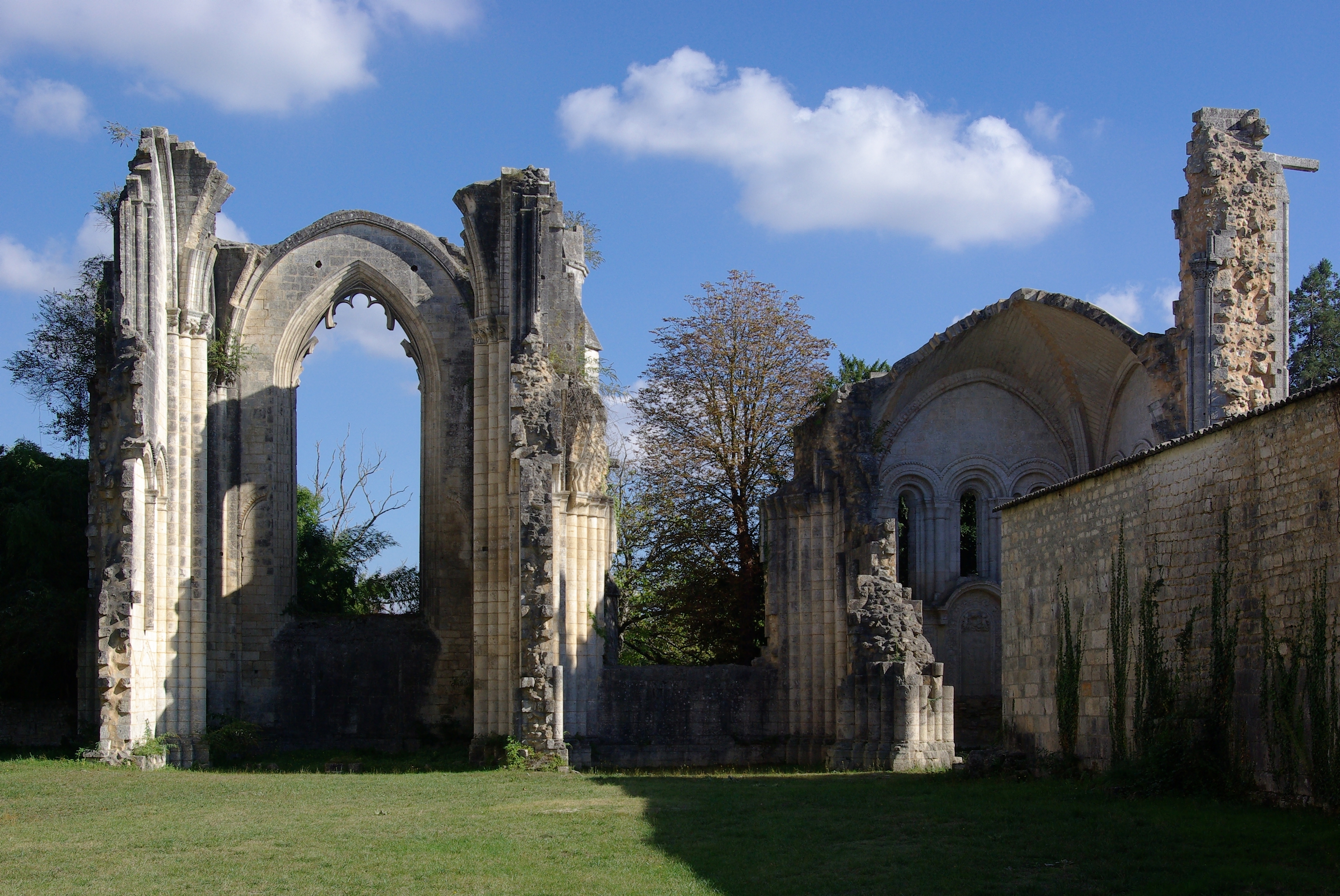
- Remains of the abbey

- Location within Nouvelle-Aquitaine

Religion
- Affiliation: Roman Catholic
- Region: Nouvelle-Aquitaine

Location
- Country: France
- Coordinates: 45°36′46.3″N 0°6′7.76″E

The Abbey of Notre-Dame de La Couronne is a monastery of canons located at La Couronne in the Charente department of France. The abbey church, now in ruins, is a testament to the introduction of the Gothic style in western France.

== History ==
=== Foundation ===
The first abbey church was constructed in the early 12th century, and several historical documents have been preserved:

- On 12 May 1118 Lambert and the monks of La Palud embarked on a deeply spiritual act, laying the foundation stone for the church of La Couronne. This marked the beginning of a sacred journey, a moment of profound significance that resonates through the centuries.
- On 12 March 1122, the day of the Passion, the religious entered the original church of La Couronne and renamed it La Couronne. This occurred in the presence of Guillaume, bishop of Périgueux, Girard, bishop of Angoulême and legate of the Holy See, and Vulgrin II, count of Angoulême. Lambert, elected abbot, was duly consecrated on Easter Day.

The first abbey church was replaced by a second, begun in 1171 and consecrated in 1201 by Archbishop of Bordeaux Abbot Junius at the end of the 11th century. This was a period of renewed spirituality following the Gregorian reform. The convent buildings were also extensively rebuilt. The Countess Isabelle d'Angoulême, a highly influential and respected figure, funded the construction of a funeral chapel dedicated to Saint Nicholas in front of the south side of the façade. This was a testament to her devotion and the abbey's great patron, Aymar Taillefer, whose remains were transferred there in 1218.

Local tradition holds that Isabelle d'Angoulême was buried in the abbey, near her father and one of her sons, Vulgrin, who died young. Her body was then exhumed and transported to Fontevraud Abbey's Cimetière des Rois by her son Henry III, King of England. La Couronne Abbey possibly received a portion of his viscera or heart, as was customary at the time, which would explain this tradition. It is also possible that there was some confusion with Isabelle, his sister-in-law, who was a nun at Fontevraud. However, the most recent research by Nicholas Vincent, a British historian specializing in the Plantagenets, suggests that Isabelle retired to Fontevraud Abbey, where she died and was buried in 1246.

The Hundred Years' War signaled the beginning of the abbey's decline. By the middle of the 14th century, the buildings were deemed disrepair. By 1427, only five monks remained. In 1450, the west and nave vaults and the bell tower collapsed. In 1500, Abbé Achard initiated the reconstruction of the abbey dwelling. Restoration of the church commenced in the early 16th century under the direction of Abbé Jean Calluau. The rebuilding was partial, involving only six of the nave's bays.

In the early 20th century

== Architecture ==
=== Monastic buildings ===
The cloister gallery, the chapter house, and the refectory remain, and the wings formerly used by the lay monks are located to the south of the abbey and date back to the 13th century. Abbot Junius' plan was based on three distinct zones: the large cloister for the canons, the converses, and the infirmary. The buildings are arranged around a courtyard enclosed by a monumental portal and were laid out in the mid-18th century thanks to Abbé Louis de Bompar. Some of the older buildings were rebuilt to match the overall facades. The reconstruction of the conventual buildings was completed with the support of the commendatory abbots. At the end of the 17th century, the architect Laurent Coustarel was commissioned to undertake the work. The abbot's distinctive architectural dwelling is in a walled enclosure to the complex's south. Constructed between the 15th and 16th centuries, the building's square towers and steeply pitched roofs evoke the style of castles from that period. A few alterations were made in the seventeenth century, further enhancing the site's historical significance.

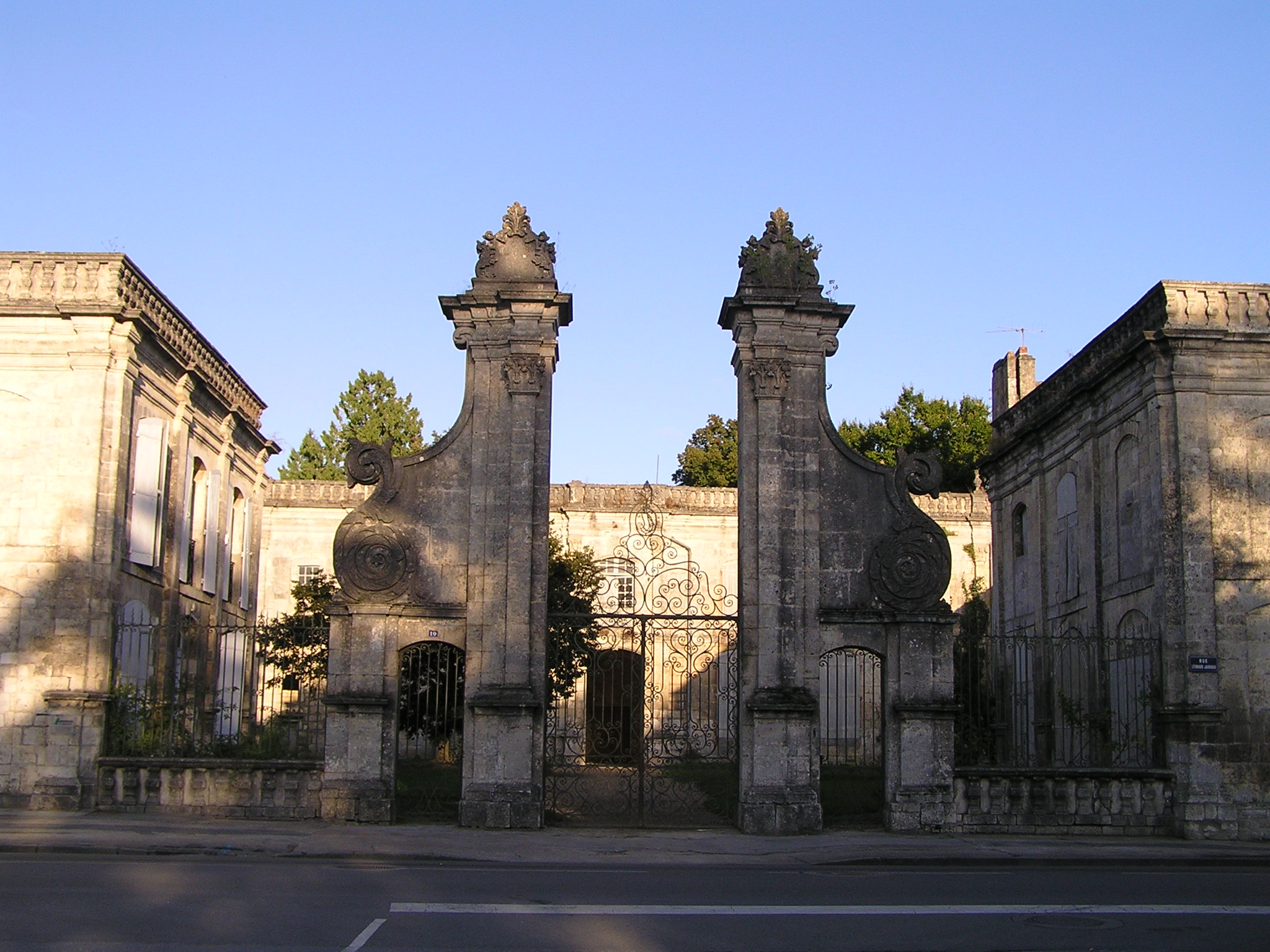
Abbey entrance

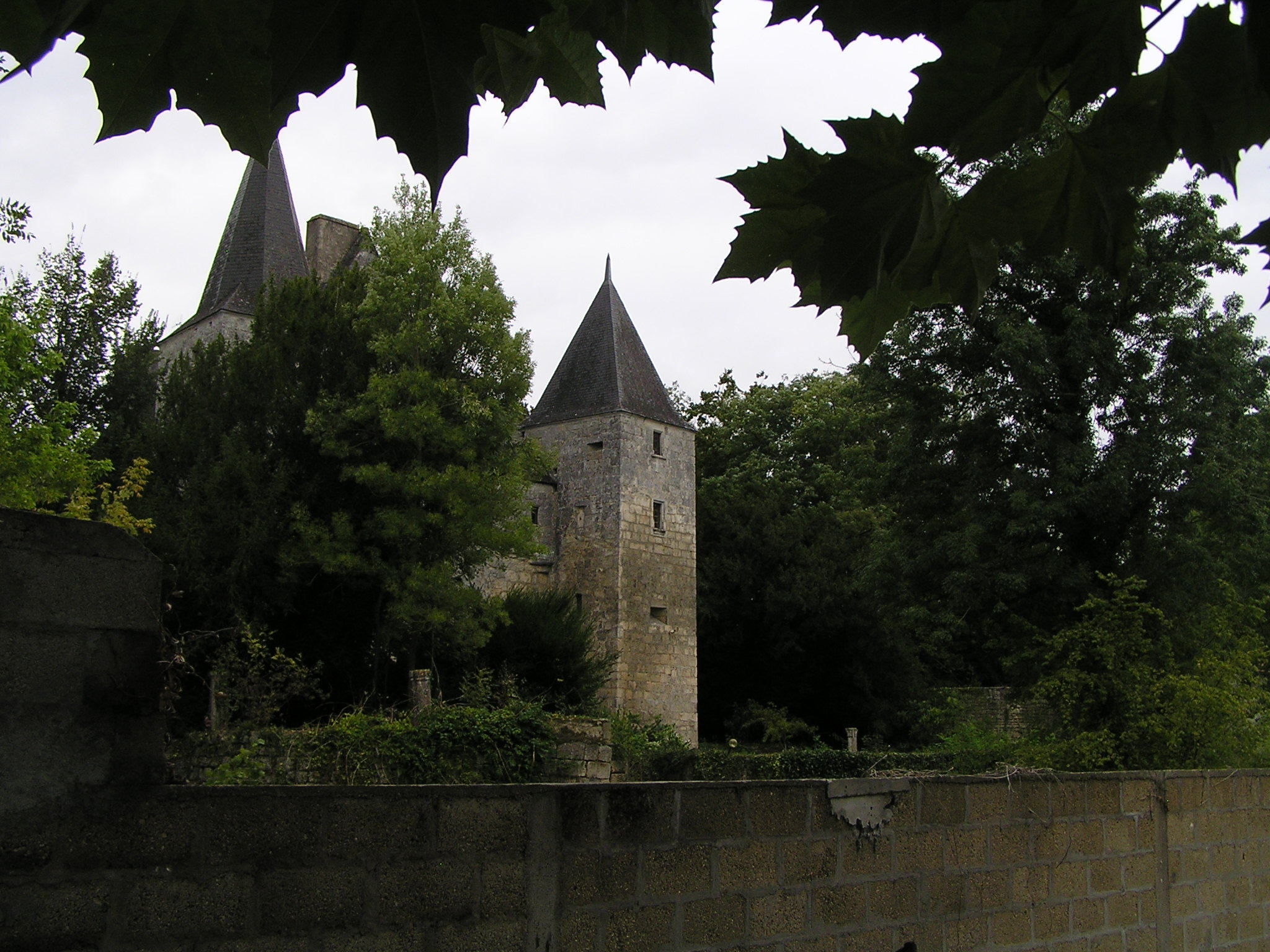
Monastic buildings

The remaining enclosure walls, sometimes with balusters, still clearly delineate the enclosure and gardens. A notable fountain from the late 17th century is situated east of the main building. The Abbey, a testament to centuries of history, was officially recognized for its cultural and historical significance when it was listed as a historic monument in 1904. In 1999, the protection was extended to all buildings, ensuring the preservation of this invaluable piece of history. The Tour-Saint-Jean manor house, previously associated with the Couronne Abbey, features a distinctive round tower with a bell-shaped roof, a rare architectural feature in the Charente region. An underground passageway cut into the rock comprises two rooms, one of which may have served as a chapel or oratory.

== See also ==
- List of abbeys and priories
- Abbey
- La Couronne, Charente

== Bibliography ==
- Société française d'archéologie; et al. (Marylise Ortiz) (1995). "L'abbaye Notre-Dame de la Couronne. Les parties médiévales". Congrès archéologique de France (in French). Paris: Derache. pp. 189–208.
- Société française d'archéologie; et al. (Christian Taillard) (1995). "Les bâtiments monastiques de l'abbaye de la Couronne". Congrès archéologique de France (in French). Paris: Derache. pp. 189–208.
- Chassebœuf, Frédéric (2006). Châteaux en Poitou-Charentes (in French). Patrimoines Medias. ISBN 2910137910.
- Dubourg-Noves, Pierre (1990). Histoire d'Angoulême et de ses alentours (in French). Privat. ISBN 9782708982468.
- François de Corlieu (1846). Recueil en forme d'histoire (in French). Paris.
- Villeneuve-Bargemont, Louis François de (1839). Histoire de saint Louis, roi de France (in French). Paulin.
- Fontenelle de Vaudoré, Armand Désiré (1834). Revue anglo-française (in French).
- Vincent, Nicholas (2004). "Isabella, suo jure countess of Angoulême (c.1188–1246)". Oxford Dictionary of National Biography (in French) (online ed.). Oxford University Press. doi:10.1093/ref:odnb/14483. (Subscription, Wikipedia Library access or UK public library membership required.)
