= La Couronne, Charente =

La Couronne
- Commune
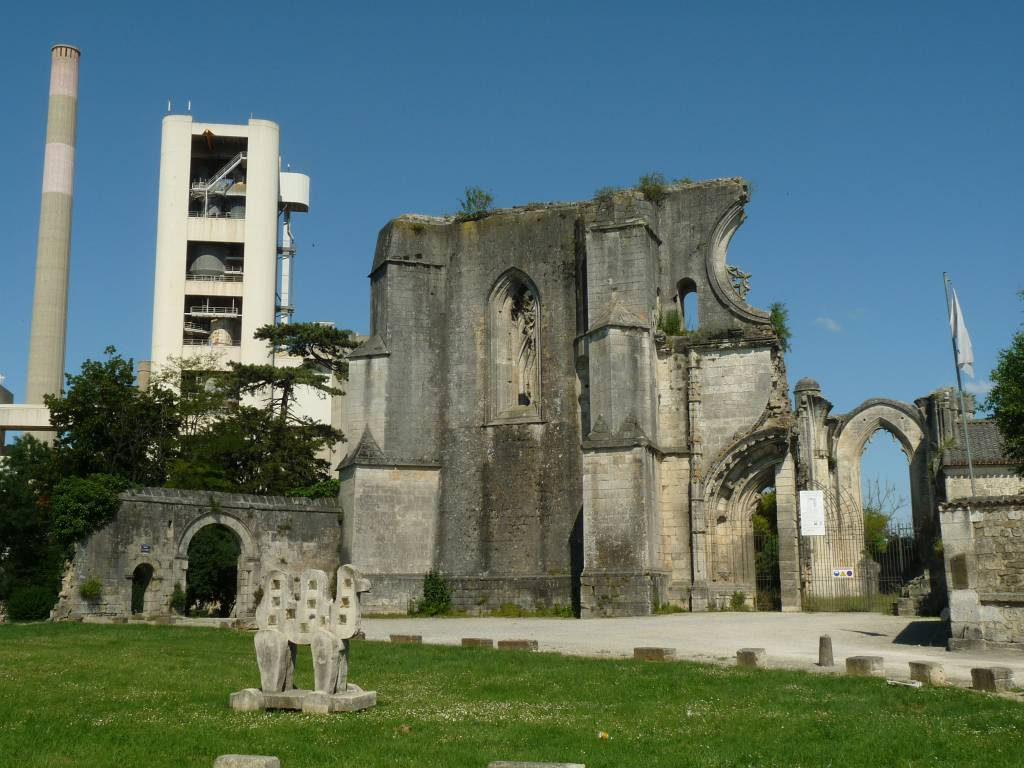
- Ruins of the abbey

- Coat of arms
- Location of La Couronne
- Location within France Location within Nouvelle-Aquitaine
- Coordinates: 45°36′30″N 0°06′03″E
- Country: France
- Region: Nouvelle-Aquitaine
- Department: Charente
- Arrondissement: Angoulême
- Canton: La Couronne
- Intercommunality: Grand Angoulême

Government
  - Mayor (2020–2026): Jean-François Dauré
- Area^{1}: 28.82 km^{2} (11.13 sq mi)
- Elevation: 100 m (330 ft)
- Highest elevation: 137 m (449 ft)
- Lowest elevation: 31 m (102 ft)
- Population (2023): 7,765
  - Density: 269.4/km^{2} (697.8/sq mi)
- Time zone: UTC+01:00 (CET)
  - Summer (DST): UTC+02:00 (CEST)
- INSEE/Postal code: 16113 /16400
- ^{1} French Land Register data, which excludes lakes, ponds, glaciers > 1 km^{2} (0.386 sq mi or 247 acres) and river estuaries.

La Couronne (French pronunciation: [la kuʁɔn]) is a commune in the Charente department in southwestern France.

The commune lies to the southwest of Angoulême. Jean-Edmond Laroche-Joubert (1820–1884) was born in La Couronne. He established two modern paper manufacturing plants in La Couronne, L’Escalier and Girac, where he installed second-generation machines almost 12 metres (39 ft) long making sheets of paper 1.25 to 1.5 metres (4 ft 1 in to 4 ft 11 in) wide.

== Climate ==
On average, La Couronne experiences 41.6 days per year with a minimum temperature below 0 °C (32.0 °F), 0.3 days per year with a minimum temperature below −10 °C (14.0 °F), 1.5 days per year with a maximum temperature below 0 °C (32.0 °F), and 26.5 days per year with a maximum temperature above 30 °C (86.0 °F). The record high temperature was 43.9 °C (111.0 °F) on June 23, 2026, while the record low temperature was −17.0 °C (1.4 °F) on January 16, 1985.

Climate data for La Couronne (1991–2020 normals, extremes 1976–present)
Month	Jan	Feb	Mar	Apr	May	Jun	Jul	Aug	Sep	Oct	Nov	Dec	Year
Record high °C (°F)	18.3 (64.9)	25.6 (78.1)	26.7 (80.1)	30.4 (86.7)	37.8 (100.0)	43.9 (111.0)	40.5 (104.9)	42.3 (108.1)	37.7 (99.9)	32.7 (90.9)	24.6 (76.3)	19.3 (66.7)	43.9 (111.0)
Mean daily maximum °C (°F)	9.5 (49.1)	11.0 (51.8)	14.8 (58.6)	17.6 (63.7)	21.5 (70.7)	25.1 (77.2)	27.5 (81.5)	27.7 (81.9)	23.8 (74.8)	19.0 (66.2)	13.3 (55.9)	10.2 (50.4)	18.4 (65.1)
Daily mean °C (°F)	6.1 (43.0)	6.6 (43.9)	9.6 (49.3)	12.0 (53.6)	15.6 (60.1)	19.0 (66.2)	20.9 (69.6)	20.8 (69.4)	17.4 (63.3)	14.0 (57.2)	9.3 (48.7)	6.7 (44.1)	13.2 (55.7)
Mean daily minimum °C (°F)	2.8 (37.0)	2.2 (36.0)	4.4 (39.9)	6.3 (43.3)	9.8 (49.6)	12.9 (55.2)	14.2 (57.6)	13.9 (57.0)	10.9 (51.6)	9.0 (48.2)	5.3 (41.5)	3.2 (37.8)	7.9 (46.2)
Record low °C (°F)	−17.0 (1.4)	−14.6 (5.7)	−11.0 (12.2)	−5.1 (22.8)	−1.0 (30.2)	1.5 (34.7)	5.0 (41.0)	4.0 (39.2)	0.5 (32.9)	−3.9 (25.0)	−8.3 (17.1)	−11.5 (11.3)	−17.0 (1.4)
Average precipitation mm (inches)	77.2 (3.04)	58.9 (2.32)	60.2 (2.37)	69.0 (2.72)	69.4 (2.73)	69.6 (2.74)	54.5 (2.15)	55.6 (2.19)	68.8 (2.71)	78.2 (3.08)	93.2 (3.67)	90.6 (3.57)	845.2 (33.29)
Average precipitation days (≥ 1.0 mm)	12.5	9.8	10.2	10.9	10.5	8.3	7.4	7.2	8.6	11.6	12.0	12.6	121.6
Source: Meteociel

== Population ==
Historical population

Year	Pop.	±% p.a.
1793	2,050	—
1800	1,407	−5.23%
1806	1,264	−1.77%
1821	1,801	+2.39%
1831	2,007	+1.09%
1841	2,355	+1.61%
1846	2,311	−0.38%
1851	2,340	+0.25%
1856	2,550	+1.73%
1861	2,700	+1.15%
1866	2,882	+1.31%
1872	2,617	−1.59%
1876	2,876	+2.39%
1881	3,301	+2.79%
1886	3,271	−0.18%
1891	3,490	+1.30%
1896	3,457	−0.19%
1901	3,700	+1.37%

Year	Pop.	±% p.a.
1906	3,847	+0.78%
1911	3,852	+0.03%
1921	3,763	−0.23%
1926	3,897	+0.70%
1931	4,271	+1.85%
1936	4,411	+0.65%
1946	4,735	+0.71%
1954	5,123	+0.99%
1962	5,257	+0.32%
1968	5,394	+0.43%
1975	5,901	+1.29%
1982	6,076	+0.42%
1990	6,295	+0.44%
1999	6,861	+0.96%
2007	7,037	+0.32%
2012	7,410	+1.04%
2017	7,732	+0.85%
2023	7,765	+0.07%

Source: EHESS and INSEE (1968-2023)

== See also ==
- Communes of the Charente department
- Abbey Notre-Dame de La Couronne
