= Ernest Arrighi de Casanova =

French politician (1814–1888)

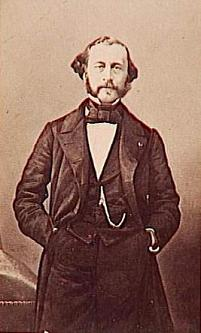
Ernest Arrighi de Casanova

Ernest Arrighi de Casanova, 2nd Duke of Padoue (26 September 1814, Paris – 28 March 1888) was a French Bonapartist politician. Son of the 1st Duke of Padoue.

He was a Senator from 1853 to 1870, and was Minister of the Interior in 1859. During the French Third Republic he was a member of the Chamber of Deputies from 1876 to 1881. He sat with the Appel au peuple parliamentary group.
