= Jean-Edmond Laroche-Joubert =

French industrialist and Bonapartist politician

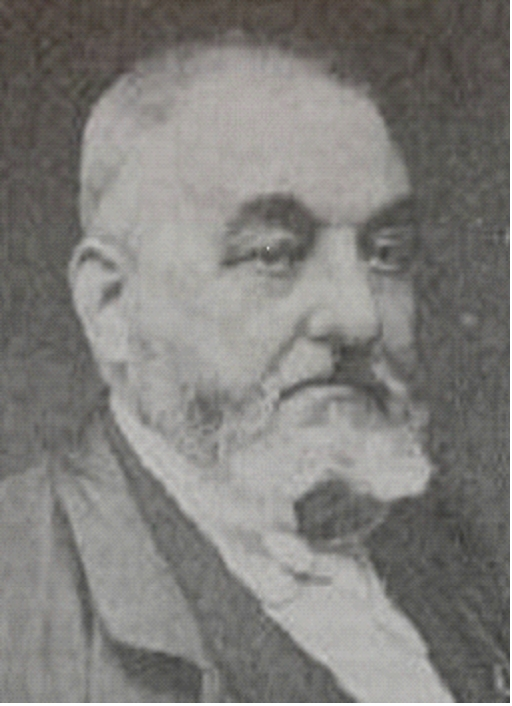

Deputy for Charente
- In office 7 November 1868 – 4 September 1870

Deputy for Charente
- In office 5 March 1876 – 23 July 1884

Personal details
- Born: 12 January 1820 La Couronne, Charente, France
- Died: 23 July 1884 (aged 64) Angoulême, Charente, France
- Occupation: Industrialist, politician

Jean-Edmond Laroche-Joubert (12 January 1820 – 23 July 1884) was a French industrialist and Bonapartist politician who was deputy for Charente during the Second French Empire and again during the French Third Republic. He developed his family paper manufacturing company into a major industrial enterprise. He was innovative in introducing profit sharing and encouraging his employees to acquire shares in the business.

== Family ==
Jean-Edmond Laroche-Joubert was born on 12 January 1820 in La Couronne, Charente. His parents were Jean Baptiste Laroche (1779–1864) and Marie Joubert (born 1786). Both his father and his mother came from old paper-making families of the Angoumois province. His father was a paper manufacturer with a large family, allied with the Barrots. On 13 October 1842 he married Marguerite Triaud (1823–1907). Their children were Jean Edgard (1843–1913) and Antoinette (1850–1869).

== Industrialist ==
At the age of 20 Laroche-Joubert began working with his father's business. Laroche-Joubert and his brother Jean officially took over the business from their father in July 1845 at a time when the paper mills were already using modern technology that had been developed in the first half of the century. The Nersac paper mill had been mechanized in 1836. At an early age Laroche-Joubert demonstrated considerable business skills. He contributed to the family company by equipping it with the most advanced mechanical equipment. In addition to the family factory of Nersac he founded several other plants and created a large industrial enterprise in Angoulême, which became "Laroche-Joubert, Lacroix et Cie" in 1863.

Laroche-Joubert mechanized the plants of the two main manufacturing centers of L’Escalier and Girac in La Couronne. He installed second-generation machines almost 12 metres (39 ft) long making sheets of paper 1.25 to 1.5 metres (4 ft 1 in to 4 ft 11 in) wide. The business continued to grow in the 1850s after the crisis of 1848, winning medals at the Paris expositions for the quality and originality of the paper products. The company was known for high quality writing papers that could be watermarked with all sorts of drawings at the choice of the buyer. It also made envelopes, notebooks for school children, account books and many other products. At one time Jean Edmond Laroche-Joubert had almost 1,500 workers and employees.

The company had several manufacturing plants including the Escalier and Girac plants in La Couronne, and workshops created in 1843 in Angoulême. A crèche was established at the factory in Angouleme, with 60 infants in 1880. In 1857 Laroche frères transformed one of four wheat mills on the Basseau dam into an annex of the Martinet paper company. In 1885 there was an attempt to transform it into a pulp mill. After Laroche frères went bankrupt, in 1888 Papeterie Laroche-Joubert bought the property.

== Social contract ==
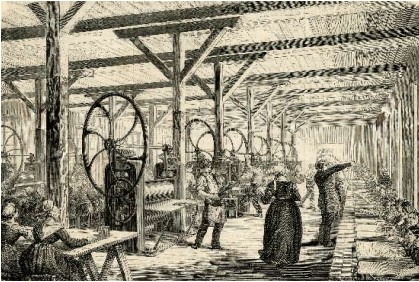
Manufacture Laroche Joubert in 1862

From 1843 Edmond Laroche-Joubert instituted profit-sharing. From 1850 he developed social works to improve the living conditions of the workers. In 1868 the company took the name "Papeterie coopérative d’Angoulême". Employees received production bonuses, a share of profits, and could acquire shares in the company and thus become co-owners. Laroche-Joubert believed that social peace must rest on social equity, the indissoluble union of capital, labor and management. These three should share the profits they generate. Throughout his life he strove for cooperation based on the principle of employee participation in the prosperity of the company. He wrote later, "The moral and material improvement of the lot of the greatest number has always been the object of my persevering efforts." Daniel Touzaud wrote in 1884,

La Maison Laroche-Joubert has created various beneficent institutions for the advantage of its personnel. There is a school and a nursery. Primary school teaching has been organized for the benefit of apprentices. There is a crèche in the company premises. Infants are received form the age of 15 days for a contribution of 0.10 francs per day. The company also provides housing to employees in Angoulême (La Cité Gabrielle) as well as at Lescalier (La Colonie). Houses are installed around the factories in the countryside. The employees are either tenants or owners. Some units are even delivered free of charge. Employees have communal or private gardens to cultivate vegetables.

== Politician ==
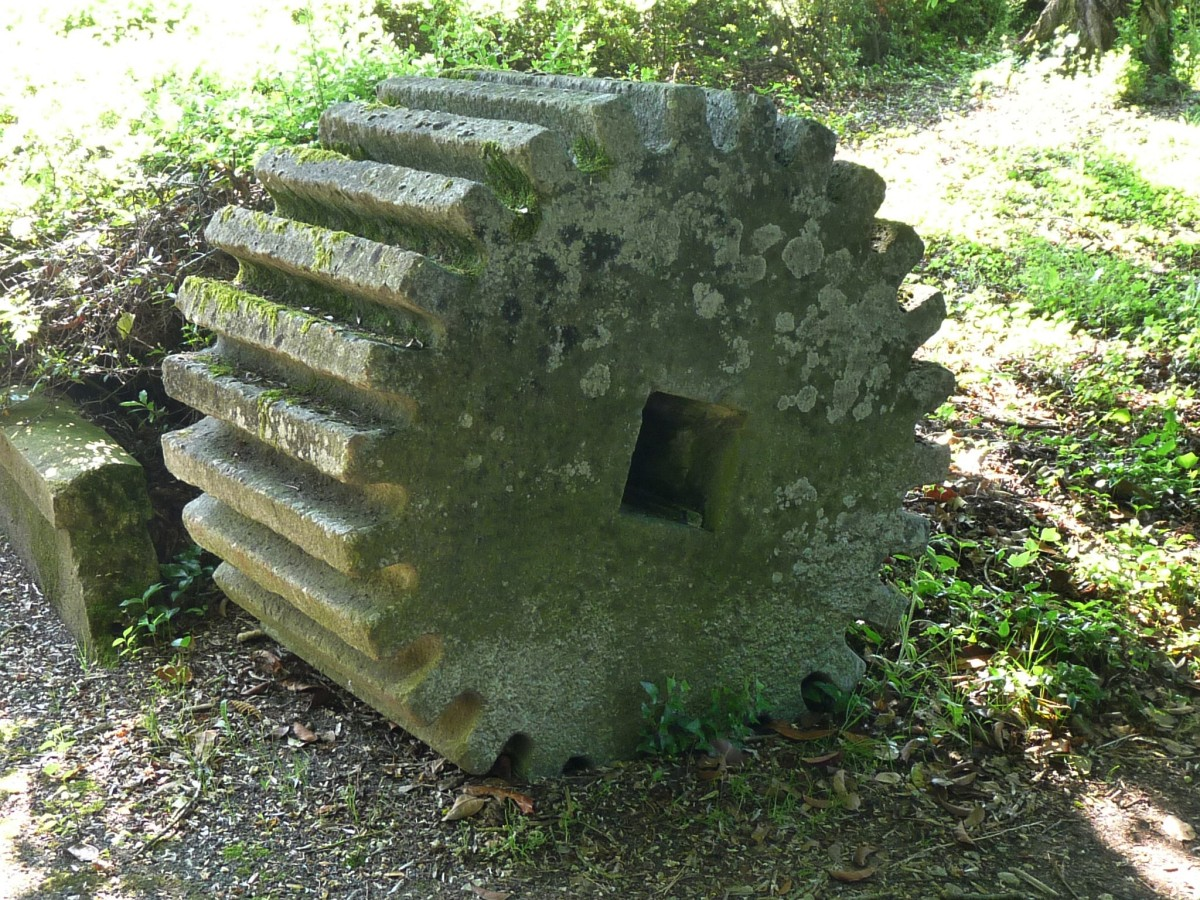
Old pulp shredding wheel at the Papeterie de l'Escalier, La Couronne

Laroche-Joubert was appointed a judge of the Commercial Court of Angoulême, Angoulême City Councilor, director of the savings bank, administrator of the charity office, and a member of General Council of the Charente department. He was elected to represent Charente in the Corps législatif on 7 November 1868. He sat with the dynastic majority. He was reelected on 23 May 1869, and sat with the center right. He was not consistent in his political stances. As a Republican, on 14 July 1970 he attempted to delay debate on the war with Prussia through a filibuster. Later he voted in favour of the declaration of war. He left office on 4 September 1870 when the French Third Republic was declared. During the war he engaged in the manufacture of cartridges. He was made a Knight of the Legion of Homour in 1870.

On 2 July 1871 Laroche-Joubert ran unsuccessfully as candidate for the National Assembly for Charente. On 5 March 1876 he ran on a Bonapartist platform and was elected in the second round for the first constituency of Angoulême. He sat on the right with the Appel au peuple group. He proposed many bills, each presented as "being of interest to the greatest number" of people. Topics included tax laws, education and cooperation. A bill asking for gymnastics to be taught in prisons was rejected on the basis that it would help "the greatest number" of thieves to climb the walls. Laroche-Joubert supported the government in the 16 May 1877 crisis, and was reelected as the official candidate on 14 October 1877. He again sat with the Bonapartist group. He was reelected on 21 August 1881, again on a Bonapartist platform, and continued to fight the leftist governments.

Edmond Laroche-Joubert died in office on 23 July 1884 in Angoulême, Charente. He was replaced in September 1884 by his son, Edgar Laroche-Joubert. His company was managed by his son Edgard and then by his grandsons.

== Publications ==
Laroche-Joubert was the author of numerous proposals, reports and speeches. A sample:

- Jean-Edmond Laroche-Joubert (1876), Proposition de loi ayant pour objet de favoriser le développement de la coopération en France, dans l'intérêt du plus grand nombre, Versailles: Impr. de Cerf et fils, p. 10
- Charles Boysset; Jean-Edmond Laroche-Joubert; Émile-Justin Menier (1877), Proposition de loi relative aux élections des juges des Tribunaux de Commerce, Versailles: Impr. de Cerf et fils, p. 10
- Jean-Edmond Laroche-Joubert (1878), Proposition de loi ayant pour objet de développer la coopération en France dans l'intérêt des populations les plus nombreuses, Versailles: Impr. de Cerf et fils, p. 11
- Jean-Edmond Laroche-Joubert (1883), Réunion ouvrière tenue à Lyon le 7 janvier 1883 (speech), Angoulême: impr. de G. Chasseignac, p. 16
- Jean-Edmond Laroche-Joubert (1884), La Question économique et sociale à la Chambre des Députés (discours prononcé, dans la séance du 26 janvier 1884), Angoulême: impr. de G. Chasseignac, p. 31

== Sources ==
- Caroli, Dorena (2016-10-31), Day Nurseries & Childcare in Europe, 1800–1939, Springer, ISBN 978-1-137-59227-9
- Conseil général de la Charente (2009), Dossier pédagogique n°4 : Jean-Edmond Laroche-Joubert (PDF), archived from the original (PDF) on 2015-09-23
- Jean-Edmond Laroche-Joubert (1820–1884) – Auteur du texte (in French), BnF: Bibliotheque nationale de France
- Jean, Edmond Laroche-Joubert (in French), Assemblée nationale
- Maupassant, Guy de (2001-05-03), Bel-Ami, OUP Oxford, ISBN 978-0-19-160587-1
- Moulin à blé de Basseau, puis usine à papier Laroche Joubert, actuellement cartonnerie Godard (in French), Inventaire général du patrimoine culturel de la Région Poitou-Charentes, 1988, archived from the original on 2018-05-10
- Pollak, Francis, Jean "Edmond" LAROCHE-JOUBERT (in French)
- Robert, Adolphe; Cougny, Gaston (1889–1891), "LAROCHE-JOUBERT (JEAN EDMOND)", in Edgar Bourloton (ed.), Dictionnaire des Parlementaires français (1789–1889) (in French)
- Wawro, Geoffrey (2005-02-21), The Franco-Prussian War: The German Conquest of France in 1870-1871, Cambridge University Press, ISBN 978-0-521-61743-7
- Touzaud, Daniel (1884), L'organisation sociale des papeteries d'Angoulême, Angoulême: Roussaud
