= Denis Gavini =

French politician

Denis Gavini (8 October 1820, Campile, Haute-Corse – 2 March 1916) was a French Bonapartist politician. He was a member of the National Legislative Assembly from 1849 to 1851, of the National Assembly from 1871 to 1876 and of the Chamber of Deputies from 1876 to 1885. He sat with the Appel au peuple parliamentary group.
