= Saint-Hilaire-de-Villefranche =

- Commune
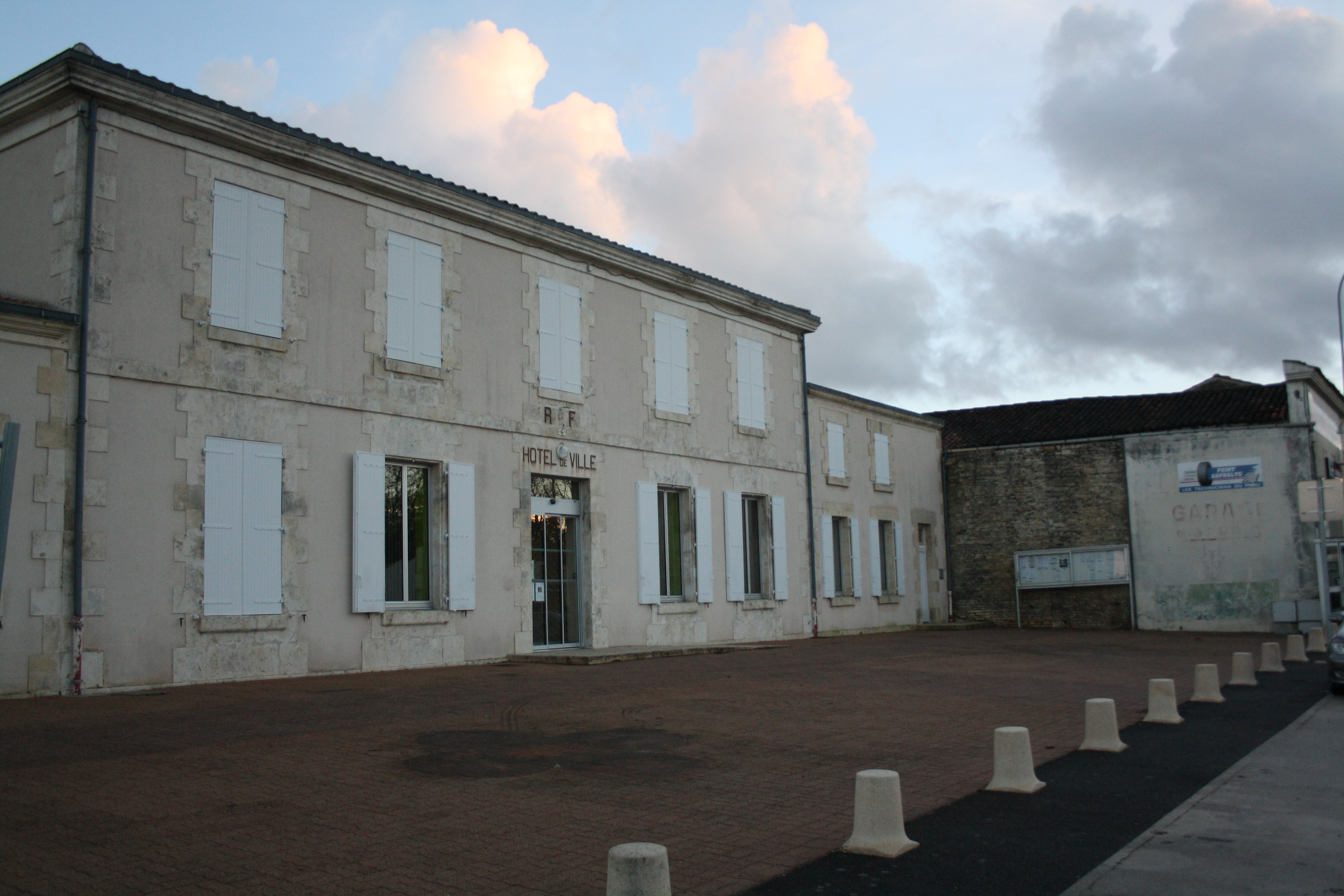
- The town hall in Saint-Hilaire-de-Villefranche
- Location of Saint-Hilaire-de-Villefranche
- Location within France Location within Nouvelle-Aquitaine
- Coordinates: 45°51′05″N 0°31′42″W
- Country: France
- Region: Nouvelle-Aquitaine
- Department: Charente-Maritime
- Arrondissement: Saint-Jean-d'Angély
- Canton: Chaniers
- Intercommunality: Vals de Saintonge

Government
  - Mayor (2020–2026): Didier Bascle
- Area^{1}: 25.08 km^{2} (9.68 sq mi)
- Elevation: 40 m (130 ft)
- Highest elevation: 95 m (312 ft)
- Lowest elevation: 22 m (72 ft)
- Population (2023): 1,350
  - Density: 53.8/km^{2} (139/sq mi)
- Time zone: UTC+01:00 (CET)
  - Summer (DST): UTC+02:00 (CEST)
- INSEE/Postal code: 17344 /17770
- ^{1} French Land Register data, which excludes lakes, ponds, glaciers > 1 km^{2} (0.386 sq mi or 247 acres) and river estuaries.

Saint-Hilaire-de-Villefranche (French pronunciation: [sɛ̃.t‿ilɛʁ də vilfʁɑ̃ʃ], before 1962: Saint-Hilaire) is a commune in the Charente-Maritime department in southwestern France. On 1 January 2019, the former commune La Frédière was merged into Saint-Hilaire-de-Villefranche.

== Population ==
Historical population
| Year | Pop. | ±% p.a. |
|---|---|---|
| 1968 | 947 | — |
| 1975 | 857 | −1.42% |
| 1982 | 1,016 | +2.46% |
| 1990 | 1,066 | +0.60% |
| 1999 | 1,095 | +0.30% |
| 2007 | 1,209 | +1.25% |
| 2012 | 1,283 | +1.20% |
| 2017 | 1,321 | +0.59% |
| 2023 | 1,350 | +0.36% |
Source: INSEE

== See also ==
- Communes of the Charente-Maritime department
