= Alphonse-Alfred Haentjens =

French industrialist and politician

Alphonse Alfred Haentjens
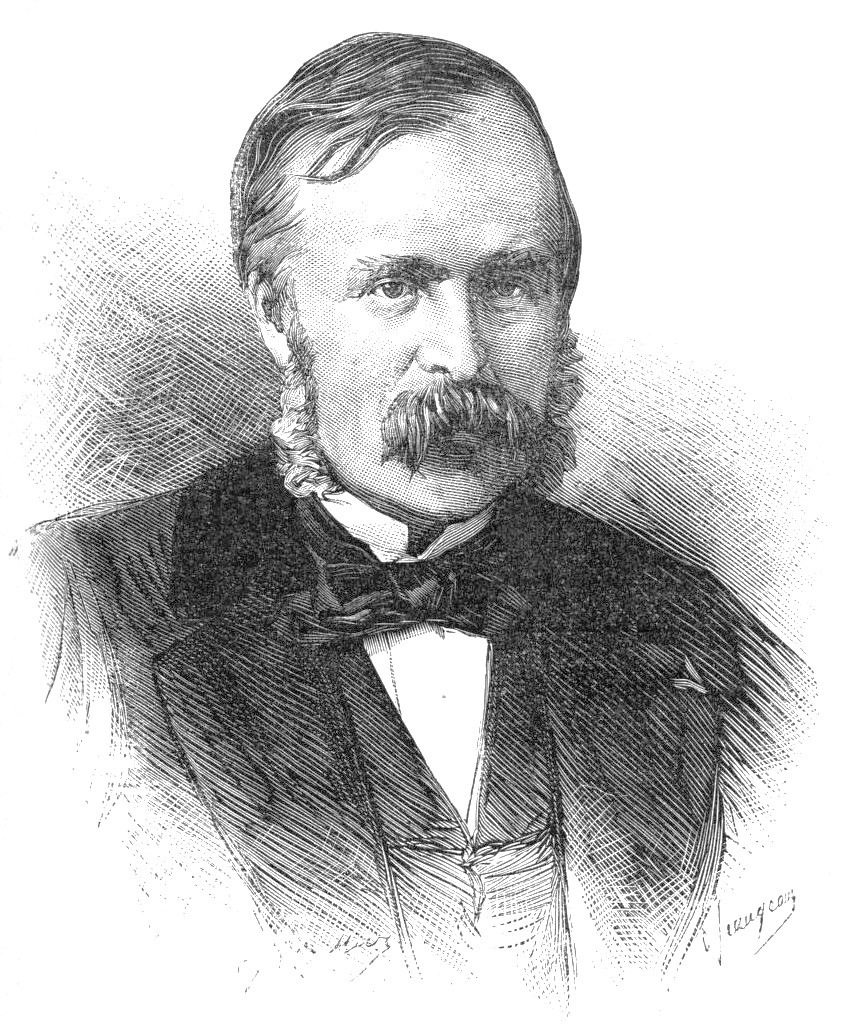
- Haentjens from Le Monde illustré, 19 April 1884

Deputy of Sarthe
- In office 31 May 1863 – 27 April 1869

Representative of Sarthe
- In office 8 February 1871 – 7 March 1876

Deputy of Sarthe
- In office 5 March 1876 – 11 April 1884

Personal details
- Born: 11 June 1824 Nantes, Loire-Inférieure, France
- Died: 11 April 1884 (aged 59) Paris, France
- Education: École Centrale Paris
- Occupation: Industrialist and politician

Alphonse Alfred Haentjens (11 June 1824 – 11 April 1884) was a French industrialist and politician.

== Early years ==
Alphonse Alfred Haentjens was born on 11 June 1824 in Nantes, Loire-Inférieure. His grandfather was the Protestant merchant Matthias Haentjens, born in Cologne in 1756, who became established in Nantes from 1780 and made his fortune from trading, insurance, arms and the slave trade. His father was Chrétien-Charles Haëntjens (1790–1836), who also became a landowner and trader and was passionately interested in scientific research. His father established the influential agricultural school of Grand-Jouan near Nozay in Loire-inférieure. His mother was Adelaide Martin-Lavallée. He studied in Vendôme at the Collège de Vendôme, now the Lycée Ronsard.

During the June Days uprising in 1848 Alphonse Alfred Haentjens fought as a volunteer for the forces of order, and received a bullet in the chest. He was decorated on this occasion. He married the daughter of Marshal Bernard Pierre Magnan. Haentjens became a shipowner. He was also involved in industry and in literature, and was one of the main shareholders of Le Monde illustré. In 1868 he founded the short-lived newspaper La Sarthe to present democratic and liberal views. It was soon displaced by Le Maine libre.

== Second Empire politics ==
Haentjens's residence and properties were in Saint-Corneille, Sarthe, and he became mayor of this town. He was a general councilor of Sarthe from 1858 to 1870, first for the canton of Le Grand-Lucé and then for the canton of Montfort. In the general elections of 1 June 1863 he ran as candidate for the legislature in the first district of Sarthe with a large majority. Haentjens was a Deputy of Sarthe in the Corps législatif until 27 April 1869, sitting with the dynastic majority, and then from 23 May 1869 to 4 September 1870, sitting with the center-left. He was made an officer of the Legion of Honour on 14 August 1869. He was somewhat independent in his parliamentary actions. He signed the interpellation of the 116^{(fr)}, and voted against declaration of war with Prussia, which launched the Franco-Prussian War of 1870.

== Third Republic ==
During the French Third Republic Haentjens was a Representative of Sarthe in the National Assembly from 8 February 1871 to 7 March 1876. He was elected by 50,467 votes out of 84,400. He sat with the right, and was among those who opposed the vote to degrade the Bonaparte dynasty. He obtained an inquiry into the 18 March 1871 insurrection of the Paris Commune. He was appointed to the budget committee. He voted in favour of peace with Germany, against the exile of the princes, for the constituent power of the Assembly, for the resignation of Adolphe Thiers, against the government of Albert de Broglie and against the constitutional laws.

Haentjens founded the Appel au peuple parliamentary group late in 1871 to restore the Second Empire's ideals of democratic imperialism and free trade. He looked for support among the rich winemakers of the southwest of France. Until this time the Bonapartists had concealed their views, but now they openly challenged both the Left and the Right. They claimed that they were more democratic than the Republicans, they mocked the Monarchists and they opposed Adolphe Thiers in his wish to tear up the low-tariff treaties of the empire.

In the elections of 20 February 1876 Haentjens was candidate for deputy in the constituency of La Mans and was elected in the second round. The election was invalidated, but in a fresh vote on 21 May 1876 his election was confirmed. He again sat with the Bonapartist right. He was the official candidate after the House was dissolved, and was returned in the elections on 14 October 1877. He was hostile to the republican ministries that then took power. In the elections on 21 August 1881 he was narrowly defeated by the republican candidate, Paillard-Ducléré, but the election was annulled and he was elected in a fresh ballot on 26 February 1882. He continued to be involved in discussions of finance and the budget, and advocated a Bonapartist change of regime.

Alphonse Alfred Haentjens died in office on 11 April 1884 in Paris.

== Publications ==
Haentjens was the author of various speeches and proposed laws published by the Chamber of Deputies. Other publications included:

- Alfred-Alphonse Haentjens (1864), Les Crises des banques, lettre à M. le gouverneur de la Banque de France, Paris: impr. de Vallée, p. 22
- Alfred-Alphonse Haentjens (1879), Réductions des impôts, développement du travail (Presentationto the Conseil général de la Sarthe), Le Mans: impr. de la "Sarthe"
- Alfred-Alphonse Haentjens (1882), Observations relatives aux prestations et au déclassement des routes départementales (Presentationto the Conseil général de la Sarthe), Le Mans: Impr. de C. Blanchet, p. 15
- Alfred-Alphonse Haentjens (1882), La Ville du Mans contre le Crédit foncier, Le Mans: Impr. de C. Blanchet
- Alfred-Alphonse Haentjens (1886), Charles Fournier-Carville (ed.), Discours et lettres politiques de M. A. Haentjens, vol. 1–2, Le Mans: impr. de C. Blanchet

== Sources ==
- Alfred-Alphonse Haentjens (1824-1884) (in French), BnF: Bibliotheque nationale de France
- Alphonse, Alfred Haentjens (in French), Assemblée nationale
- Anciens élèves devenus célèbres (in French), Lycée Ronsard
- Carluer, Jean-Yves (2016), "Les Haentjens, hommes d'affaires et protestants nantais (1780 -vers 1850)", Cinq siècles de protestantisme en Bretagne (in French)
- Chapman, Guy (1962-06-18), Third Republic of France, Palgrave Macmillan UK, ISBN 978-1-349-00463-8
- "Petit panorama de la presse écrite en Sarthe", LK Magazine (in French)
- Robert, Adolphe; Cougny, Gaston (1889–1891), "HAENTJENS (ALPHONSE ALFRED)", in Edgar Bourloton (ed.), Dictionnaire des Parlementaires français (1789-1889) (in French)
