= Floquet =

Floquet is a French or Catalan surname. Notable people with the surname include:

- Charles Floquet, French prime minister
- Étienne-Joseph Floquet, French composer
- Gaston Floquet, French mathematician

Floquet is also the name of:

- Snowflake (gorilla) ("Floquet de Neu"), gorilla resident in Barcelona
