= Jean-Baptiste Boffinton =

French politician

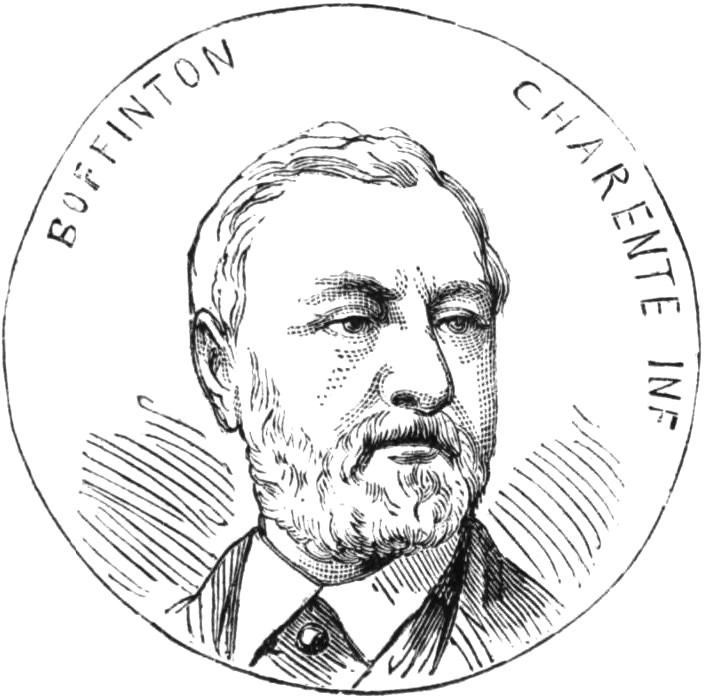
Boffinton from Le Monde illustré, 12 February 1876

Jean-Baptiste Boffinton (27 August 1817 – 11 December 1899) was a French Bonapartist politician.

== Life ==
Jean-Baptiste Stanislas Boffinton was born on 27 August 1817, in Bordeaux, Gironde. He was a member of the National Assembly for Charente-Inférieure from 11 May 1873 to 7 March 1876, and sat with the Appel au peuple parliamentary group. He was a Senator from 30 January 1876 to 24 January 1885. During his campaign for the senate, Boffinton and the former deputies Auguste Roy de Loulay and Alfred de Vast-Vimeux signed a circular in which they declared,

"In the day of peril, on the 24th of May, we have placed Marshal MacMahon in power, that is to say that respecting the rights conferred on him by the Constitution we shall support with all our energy the government which has so clearly affirmed its desire to combat the spread of anti-social doctrines and revolutionary programs. But when the time comes to revise the Constitution, as supporters of the appel au peuple (plebiscite), we will demand the right of the nation to pronounce directly on the form of its government."

Jean-Baptiste Boffinton died on 11 December 1899 in Arcachon, Gironde.

== Sources ==
- Clère, Jules (1876), Biographie complète des sénateurs (in French), Garnier
- Jean-Baptiste, Stanislas Boffinton (in French), Assemblée nationale
