= Eugène Eschassériaux =

French politician (1823–1906)

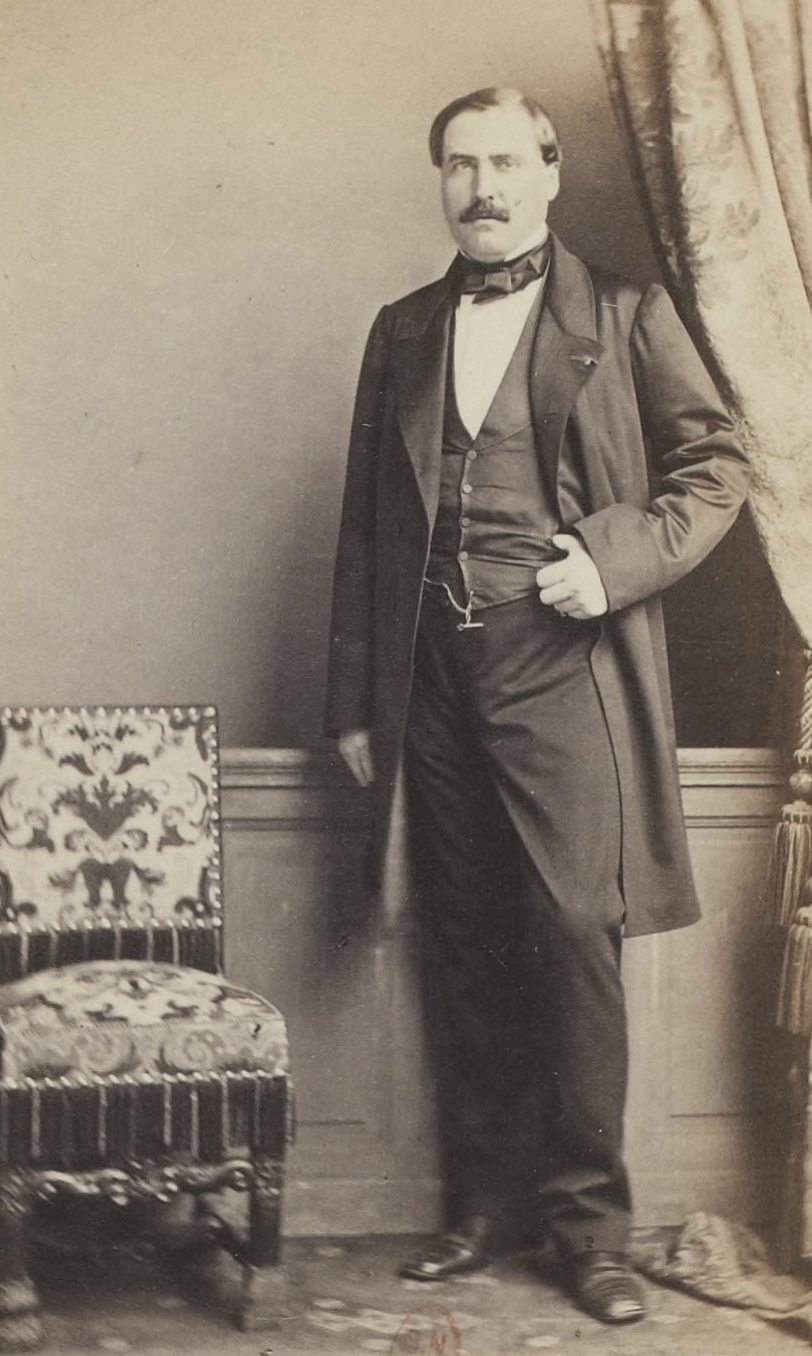
Eugène Eschassériaux

Baron Eugène Eschassériaux (25 July 1823, Thénac, Charente-Maritime – 31 August 1906) was a French Bonapartist politician. He was a member of the National Legislative Assembly from 1849 to 1851, of the Corps législatif from 1852 to 1870, of the National Assembly from 1871 to 1876 and of the Chamber of Deputies from 1876 to 1893. He sat with the Appel au peuple parliamentary group.

He also carried out archaeological investigations around Thénac.
