= Musée national des Monuments Français =

Museum of plaster casts of French monuments

Coordinates: 48.8632°N 2.2896°E

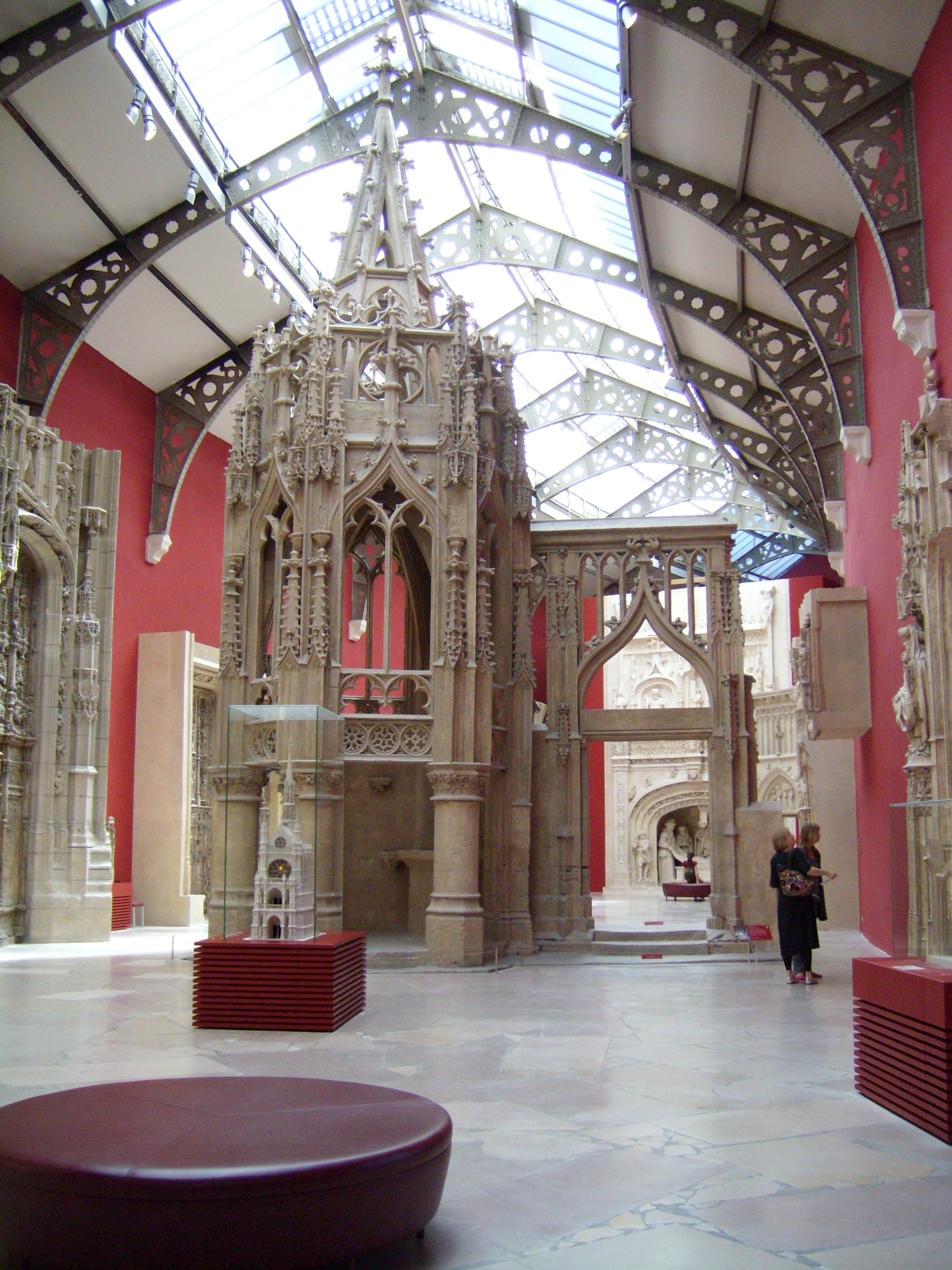
Musée des Monuments Français, Galerie Davioud.

The Musée national des Monuments Français (French pronunciation: [myze nɑsjɔnal de mɔnymɑ̃ fʁɑ̃sɛ]; transl. "National Museum of French Monuments") is today a museum of plaster casts of French monuments located in the Palais de Chaillot, 1, place du Trocadéro et du 11 Novembre, Paris, France. It now forms part of the Cité de l'Architecture et du Patrimoine, and is open daily except Tuesday. An admission fee is charged.

The museum's name evokes the earlier Musée des Monuments français opened in 1795 by Alexandre Lenoir, which displayed actual monuments of French Medieval and Renaissance art, removed from churches and châteaux after the French Revolution. Lenoir's museum remained open until the Bourbon Restoration of 1816, and was highly influential on French taste, making the medievalism of the Troubadour style popular, and providing inspiration to its artists.

== History ==
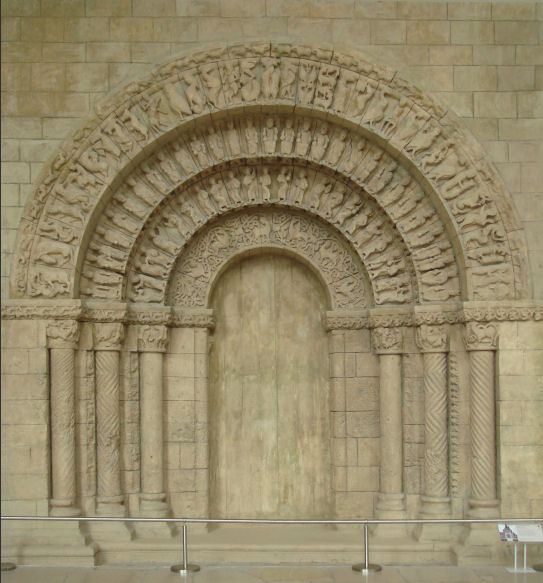
Portal of the Church of Saint-Pierre d'Aulnay, Aulnay-de-Saintonge, mid-12th century.

The architect Eugène Viollet-le-Duc suggested gathering reproductions of French sculpture and architecture at a single site in the palais du Trocadéro in 1879, in buildings left vacant after the Exposition universelle in 1878. His proposal was accepted on 4 November. Edmond Du Sommerard would be designated on 20 December to form the musée de la Sculpture comparée. The institution opened its four rooms to the public on 28 May 1882, three more in 1886 and finally its library and foundational documents in 1889.

The palais du Trocadéro, refaced and widened by a second gallery but deprived of its central hemispherical hall, under the direction of architect Jacques Carlu for the Exposition universelle of 1937, became the palais de Chaillot. Wholly redesigned, the museum became the musée des Monuments français. Very avant-garde in terms of its museographic conception and intellectual experimentation, notably through the efforts of the archaeologist Paul Deschamps, it had to close down due to an insufficient budget. In July 1995, a fire partially destroyed the building. Its planned reopening in 1998 was pushed back to 15 September 2007 in connection with the creation of the Cité de l'Architecture et du Patrimoine.

=== Today ===
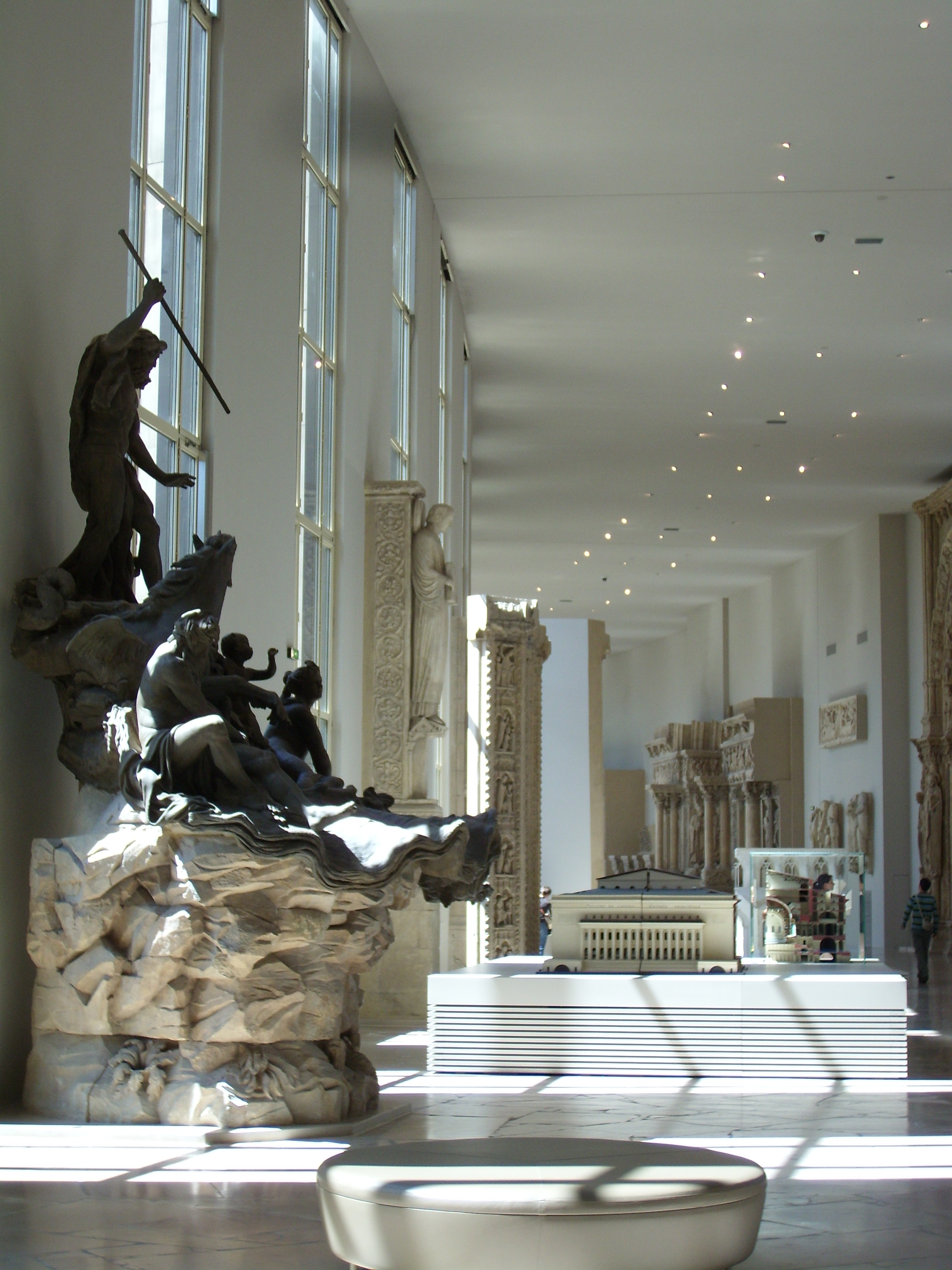
Galerie Carlu

It occupies the aile Paris of the Palais de Chaillot and is made up of three galleries. The galerie Davioud (1878) and galerie Carlu (1937) form a gallery of plaster casts. The upper gallery serves as an exhibition space for modern and contemporary architectural models. Wall paintings and stained glass windows are located at the end of the modern and contemporary architecture gallery; they are shown on two levels. There is also a library as well as rooms for temporary exhibitions.

== Collections ==
It contains about 6,000 casts of sculptures of all periods including ancient Greece, Italy, Germany, and Switzerland, but with a strong emphasis on French sculptures of the Romanesque and Gothic periods. It also contains scale models of buildings, copies of architectural elements, sculpture, frescoes, and stained glass from French churches and châteaux, as well as a collection of about 200,000 photographs. Most casts were made in the late 19th and early 20th centuries.

Of particular interest is the Galerie Davioud, which displays casts of sculptures from Strasbourg Cathedral (13th century), Bourges Cathedral (late 13th century), and Notre-Dame de Reims. The museum also contains casts of elements from Angoulême Cathedral, Aulnay, Autun, Cluny, Conques, Jouarre, Moissac, Sainte-Marie-des-Dames at Saintes, Saint-Gilles-du-Gard, Saint-Trophime d'Arles, Saint-Génis-des-Fontaines, Saint-Sernin at Toulouse, and Notre-Dame du Port at Clermont-Ferrand.

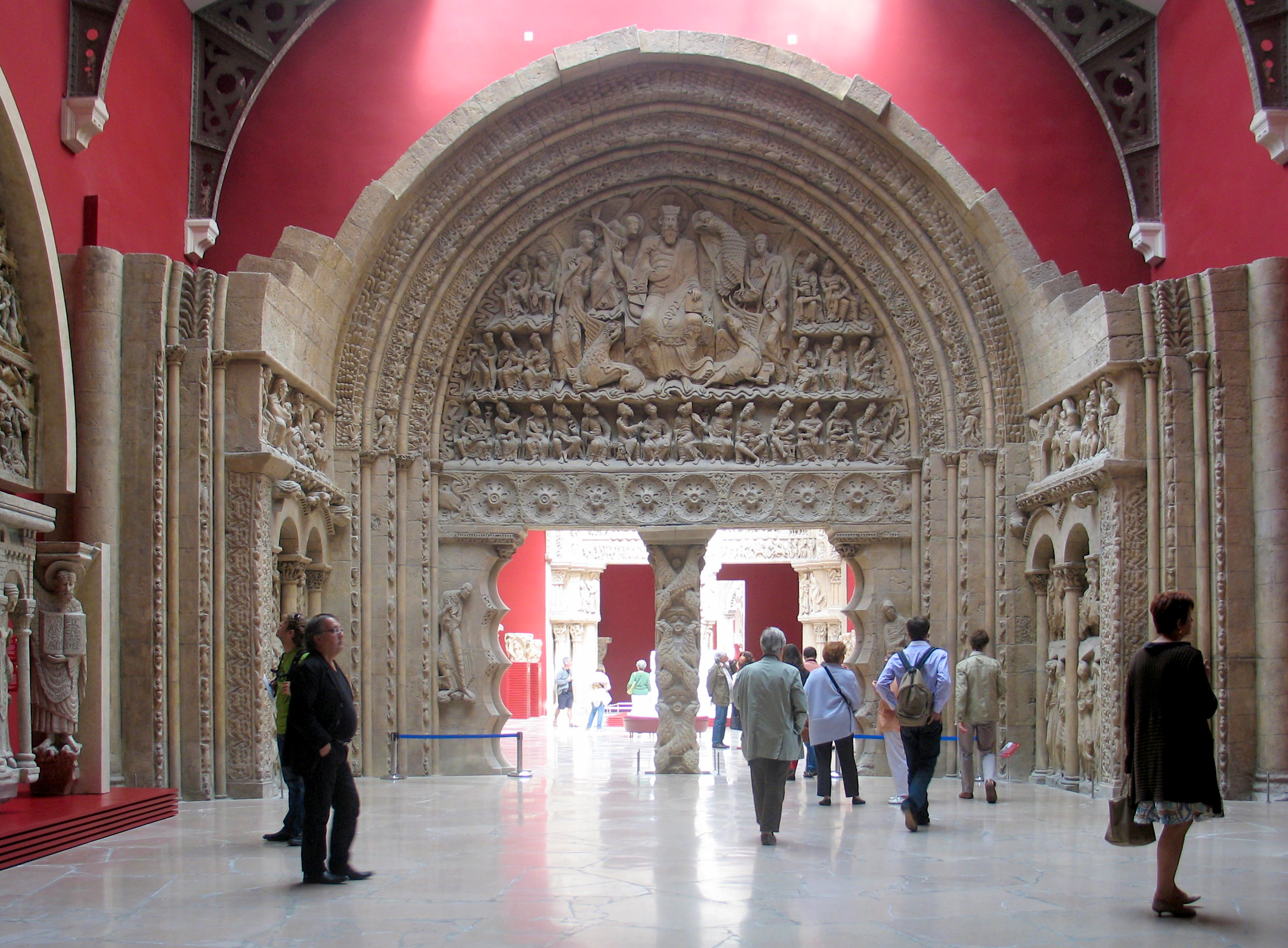
Galerie Davioud, romanesque Languedoc room

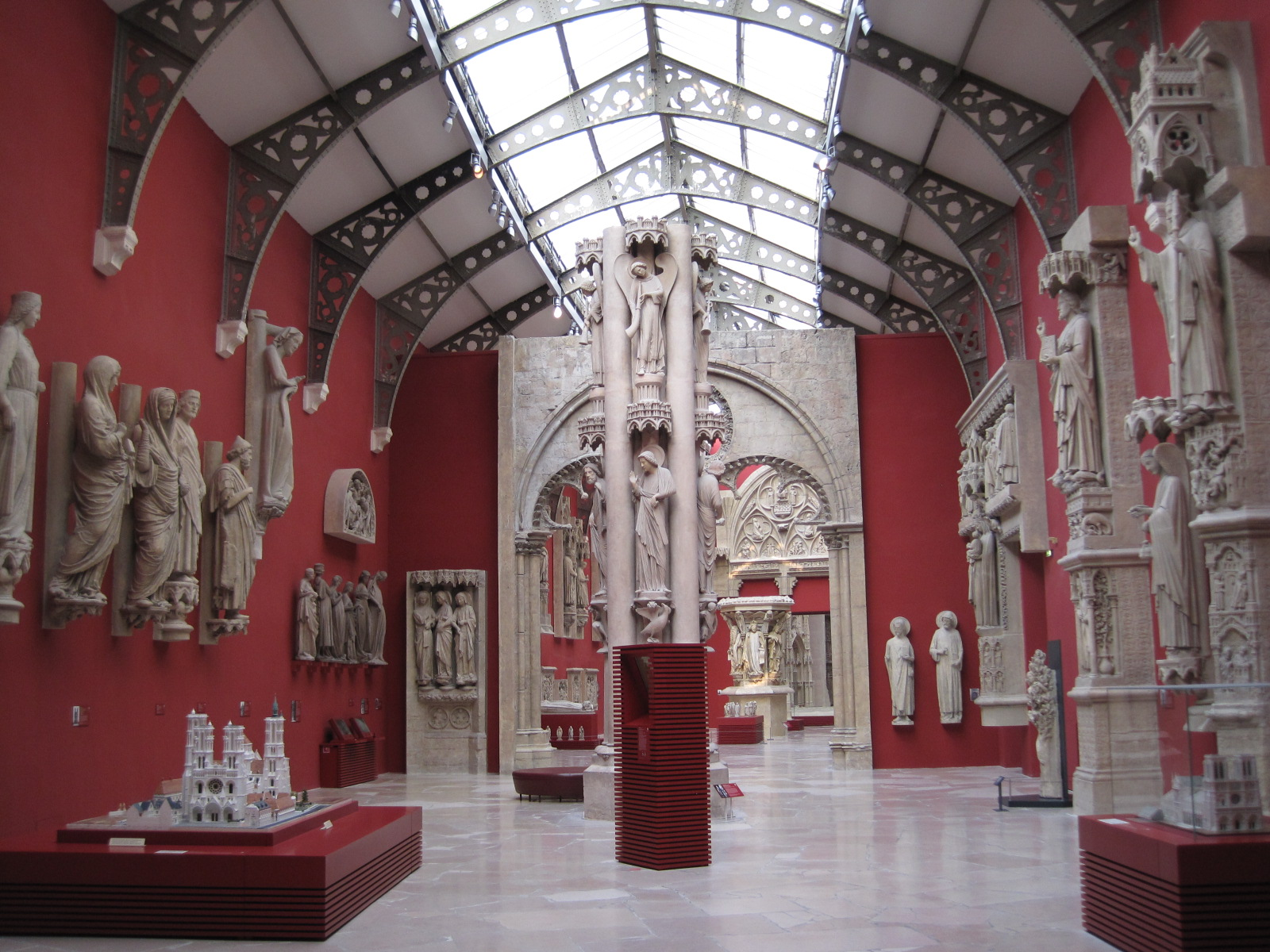
Galerie Davioud, gothic room

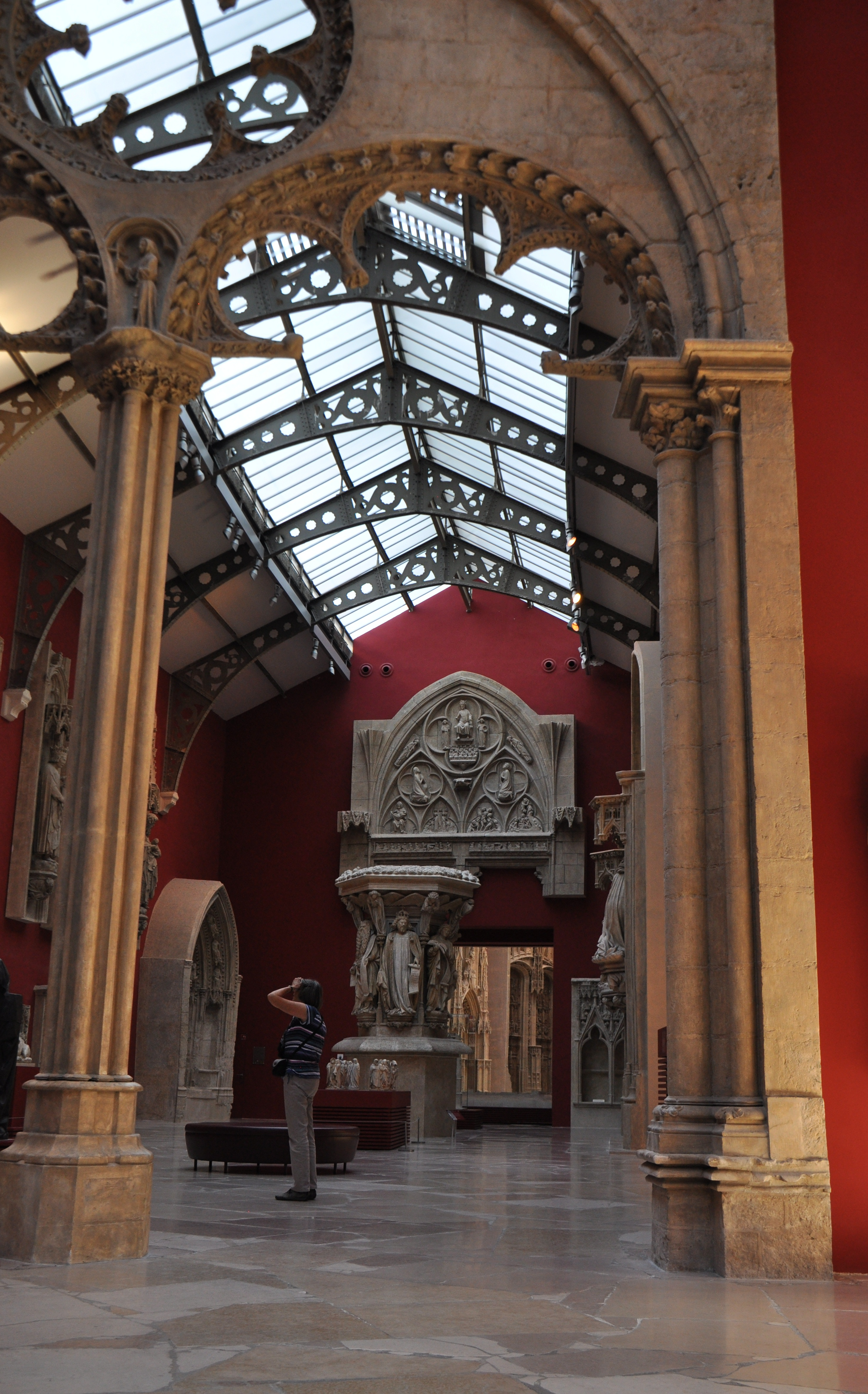
Galerie Davioud

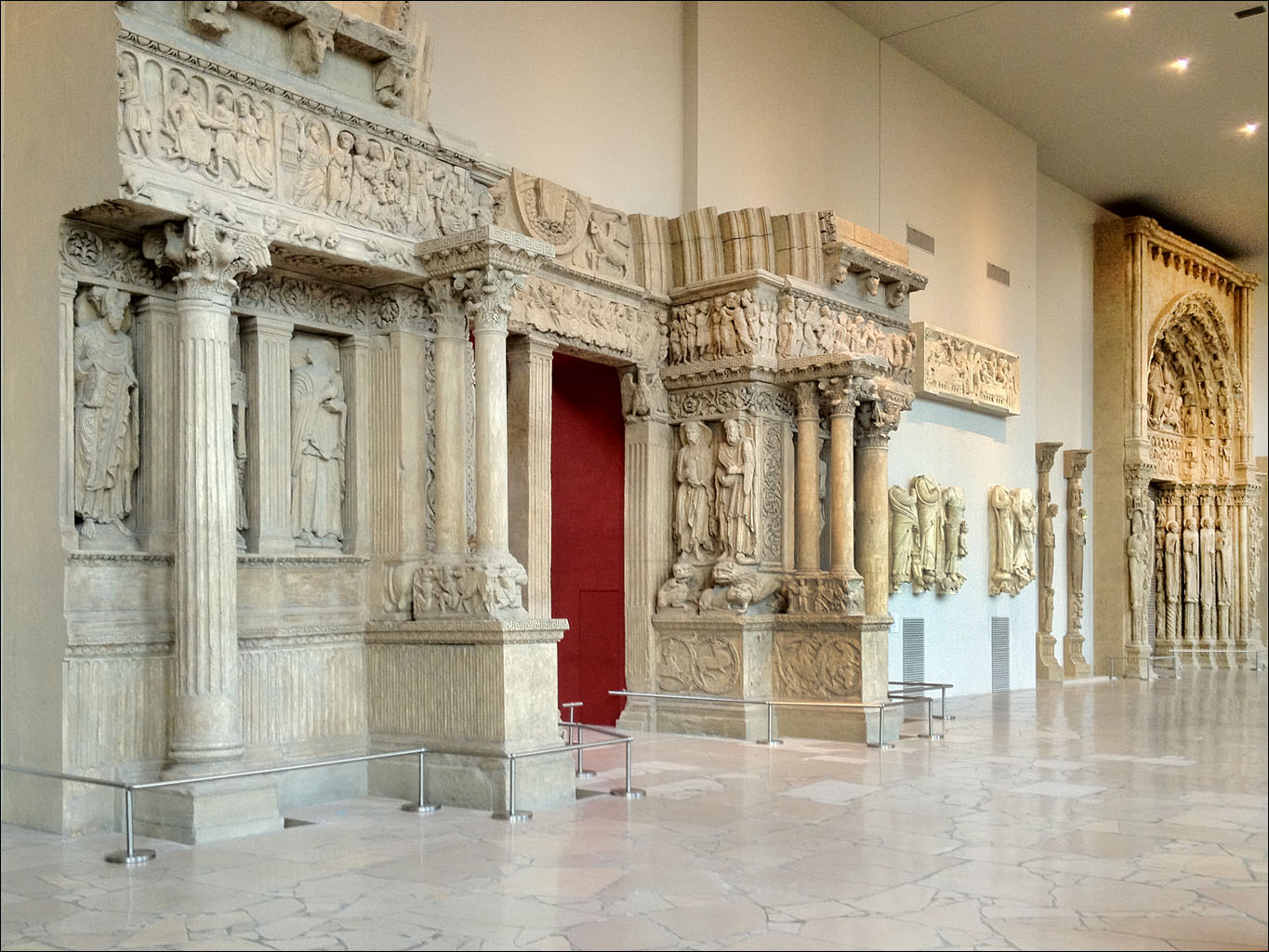
Galerie Carlu, Provence

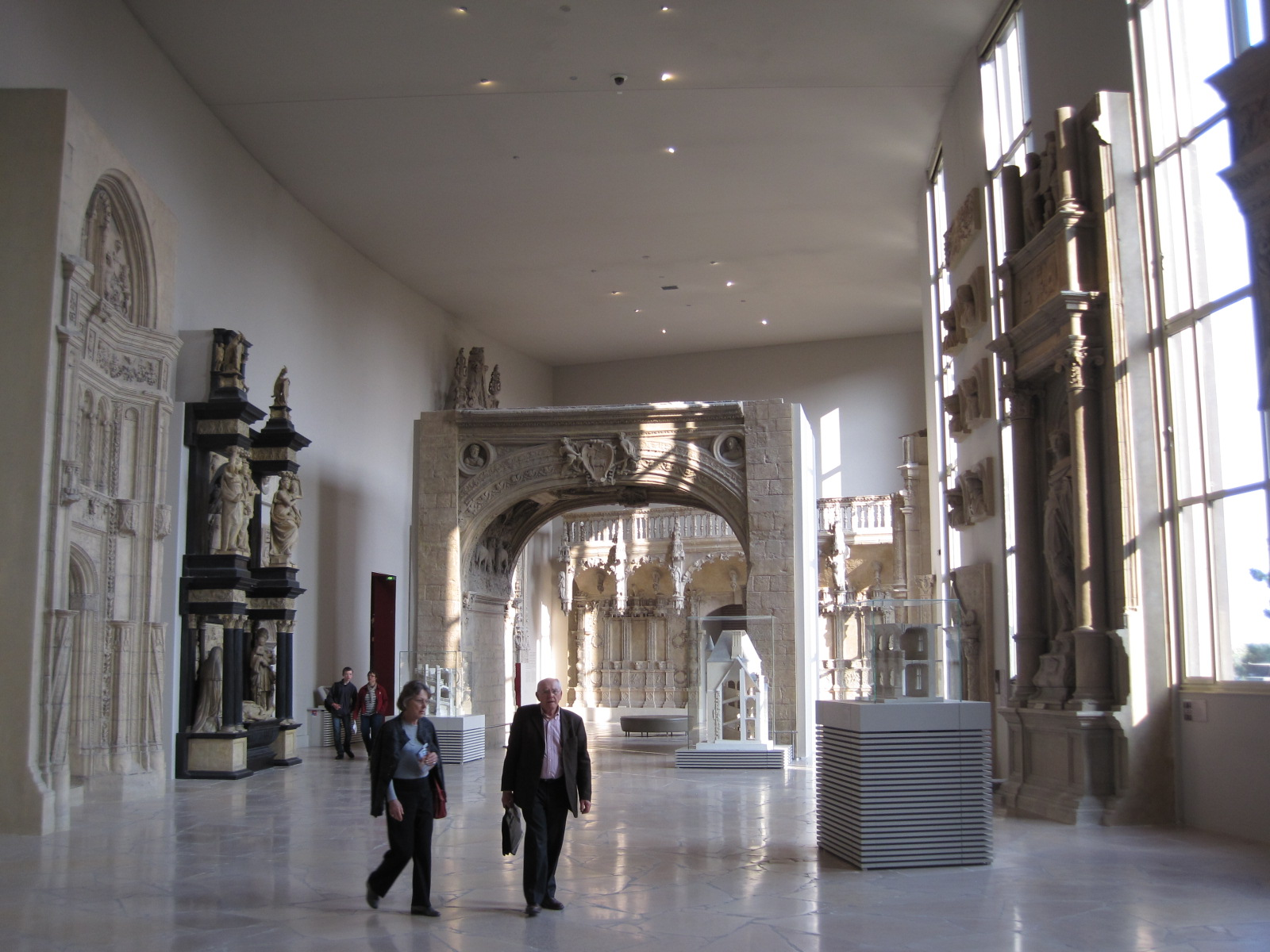
Galerie Carlu, XVIth c.

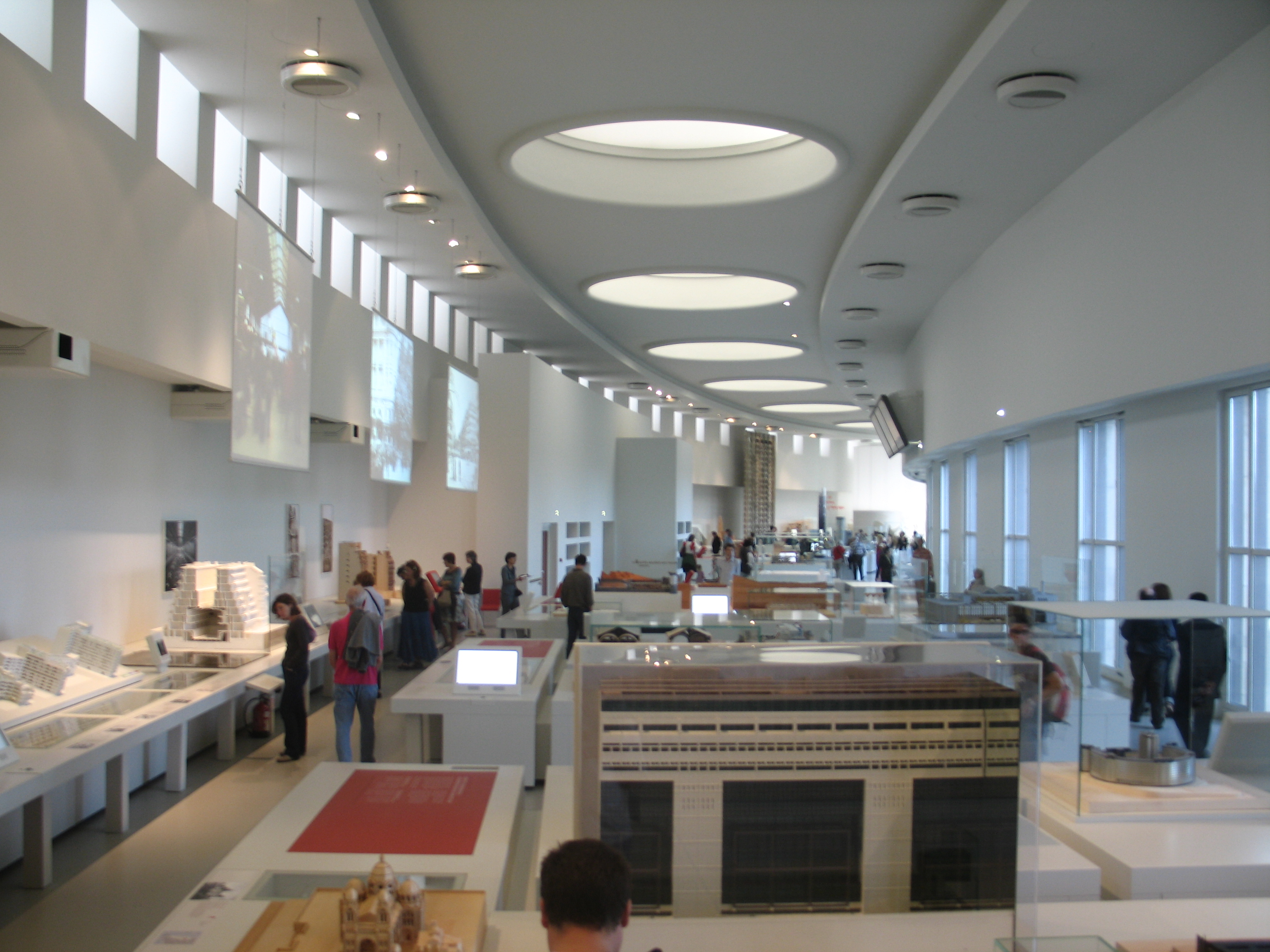
Gallery of modern and contemporary architecture

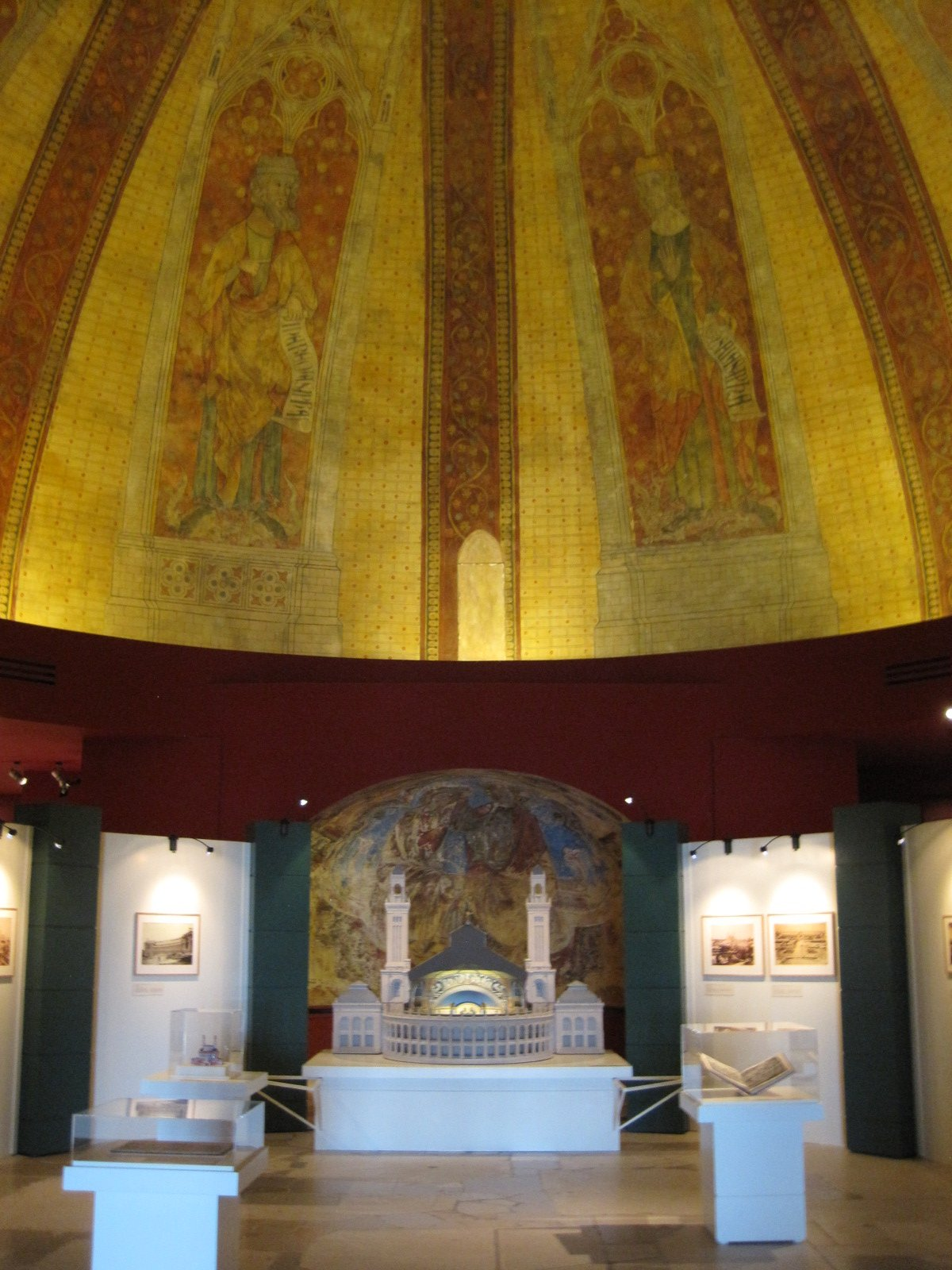
Gallery of paintings, cupola of Cahors cathedral

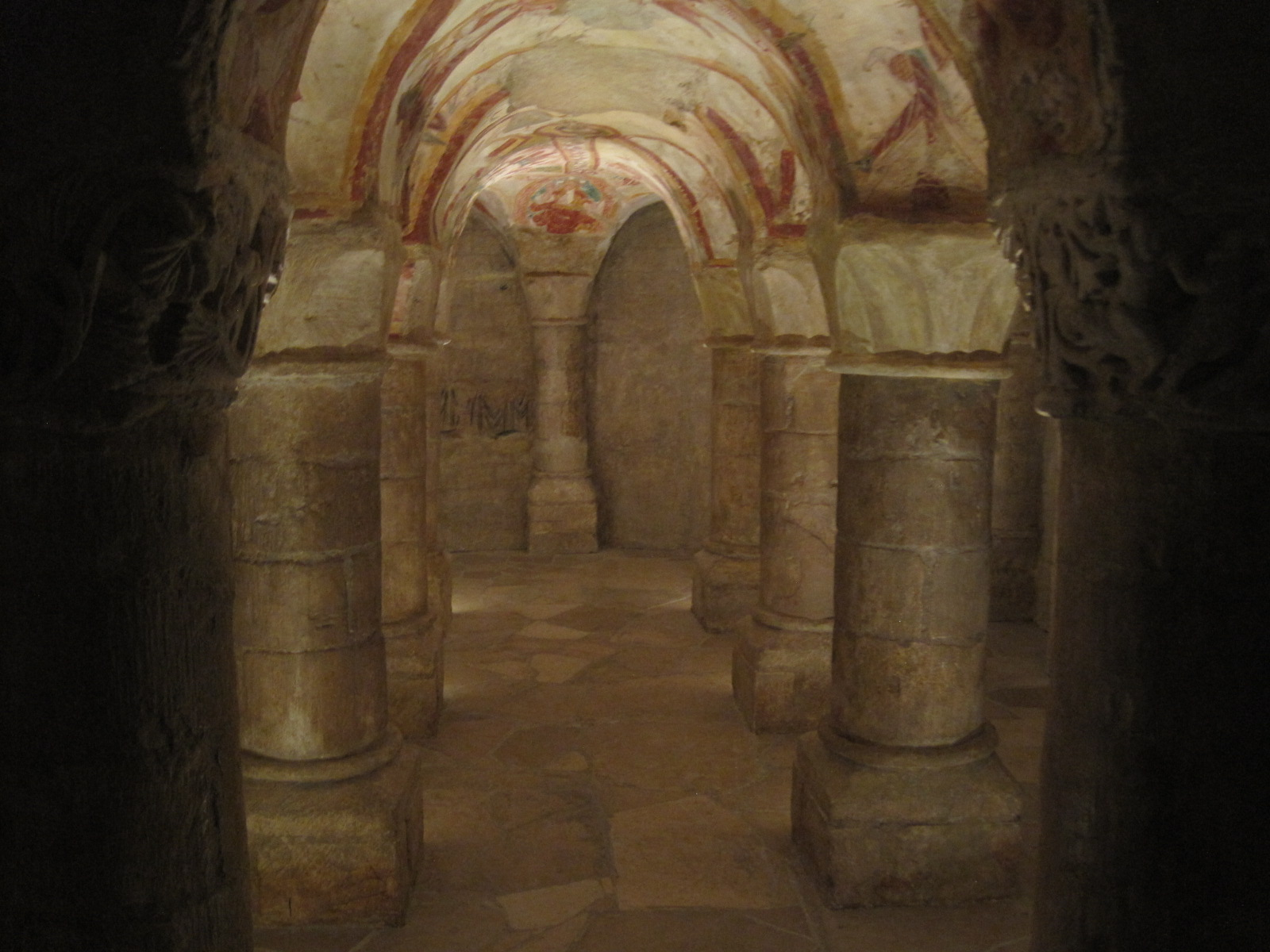
Gallery of paintings and stained glasses, crypt

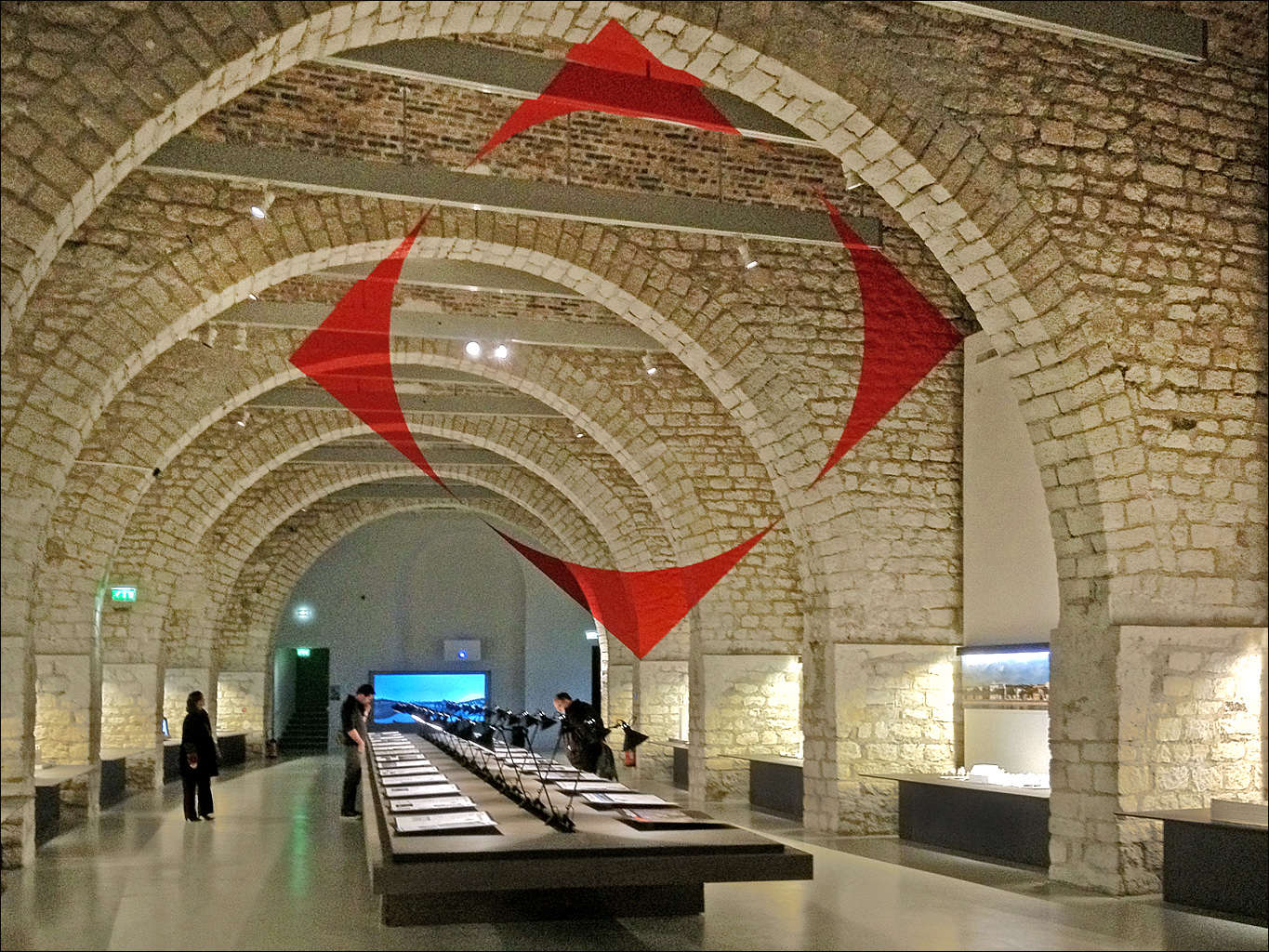
Temporary exhibitions galleries

== See also ==
- List of museums in Paris
- Musée de Cluny
