= Musée des monuments français =

Musée des Monuments français may refer to two separate museums in Paris:

- The Musée des Monuments français (1795–1816) created by Alexandre Lenoir
- The Musée national des Monuments Français, first opened in 1882
