= Aulnay =

Aulnay is the name or part of the name of several communes in France:

- Aulnay, Aube, in the Aube département
- Aulnay, Charente-Maritime, in the Charente-Maritime département
- Aulnay, Vienne, in the Vienne département
- Aulnay-l'Aître, in the Marne département
- Aulnay-la-Rivière, in the Loiret département
- Aulnay-sous-Bois, in the Seine-Saint-Denis département
- Aulnay-sur-Iton, in the Eure département
- Aulnay-sur-Marne, in the Marne département
- Aulnay-sur-Mauldre, in the Yvelines département

== See also ==
- D'Aulnay (disambiguation)
- D'Aulnoy
