= D'Aulnay =

d'Aulnay may refer to:

- Charles de Menou d'Aulnay (c. 1604–1650), French pioneer in North America and Governor of Acadia
- Church of Saint-Pierre d'Aulnay, a medieval church in Aulnay, Charente-Maritime, France
- Philip of Aunay (Philippe d'Aulnay) (c. 1290–1314), Norman knight
- Vilain I of Aulnay (Villain d'Aulnay) (c. 1300s), knight from Aulnay-l'Aître, France

== See also ==
- Aulnay (disambiguation)
- Daulnay, New Brunswick
- Madame d'Aulnoy (1650/1651 – 1705), French writer
