= Aulnay, Charente-Maritime =

Aulnay
- Commune
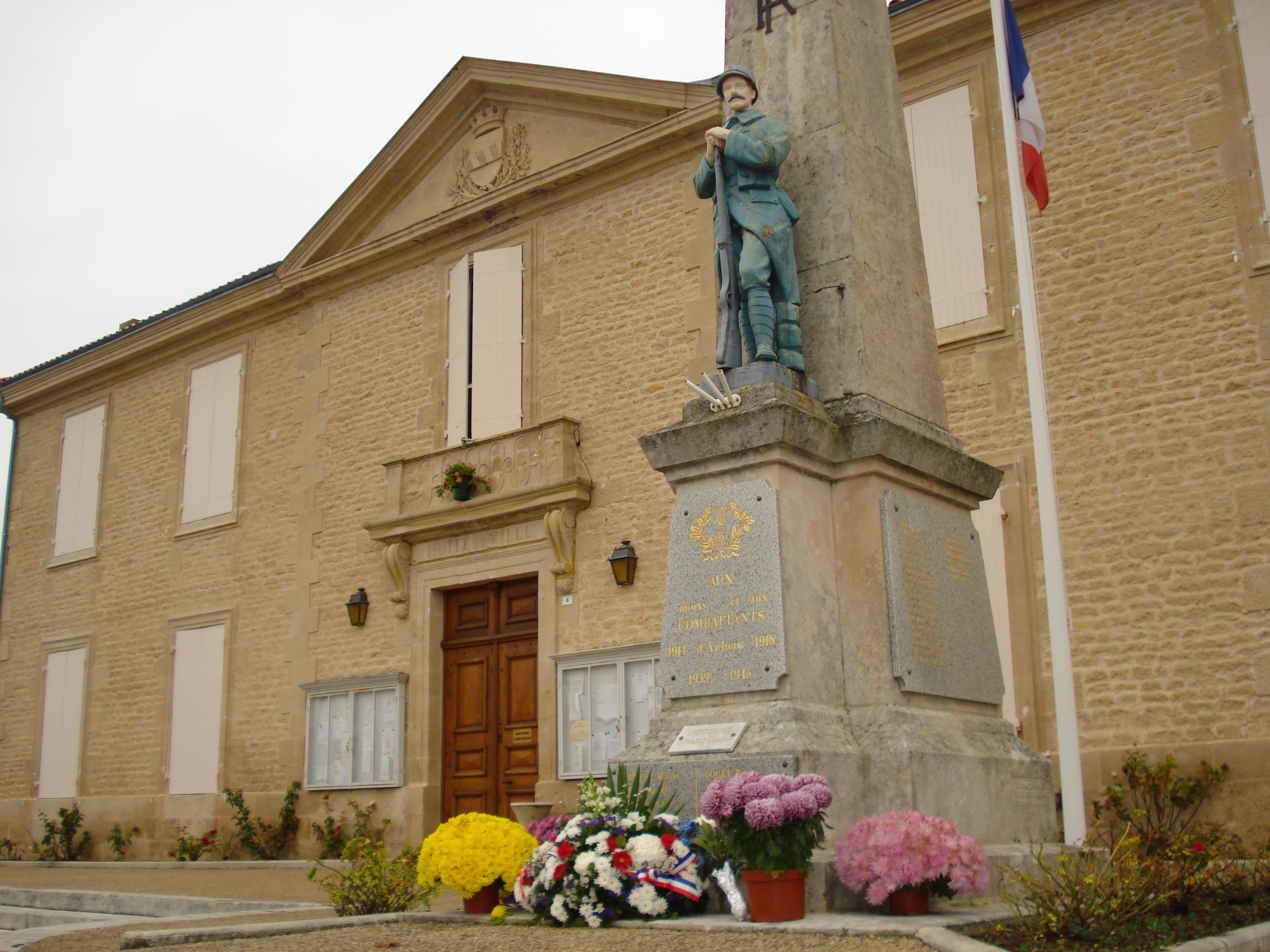
- Town hall and war memorial

- Coat of arms
- Location of Aulnay
- Location within France Location within Nouvelle-Aquitaine
- Coordinates: 46°01′18″N 0°20′44″W
- Country: France
- Region: Nouvelle-Aquitaine
- Department: Charente-Maritime
- Arrondissement: Saint-Jean-d'Angély
- Canton: Matha
- Intercommunality: CC Vals Saintonge

Government
  - Mayor (2020–2026): Stéphane Chedouteaud
- Area^{1}: 30.97 km^{2} (11.96 sq mi)
- Elevation: 54 m (177 ft)
- Highest elevation: 107 m (351 ft)
- Lowest elevation: 32 m (105 ft)
- Population (2023): 1,410
  - Density: 45.5/km^{2} (118/sq mi)
- Demonym: Aulnaysien.ne
- Time zone: UTC+01:00 (CET)
  - Summer (DST): UTC+02:00 (CEST)
- INSEE/Postal code: 17024 /17470
- ^{1} French Land Register data, which excludes lakes, ponds, glaciers > 1 km^{2} (0.386 sq mi or 247 acres) and river estuaries.

Aulnay, commonly referred to as Aulnay-de-Saintonge (French pronunciation: [onɛ də sɛ̃tɔ̃ʒ]), is a commune in Charente-Maritime, a department in the Nouvelle-Aquitaine region (before 2015: Poitou-Charentes), France.

== Geography ==
Aulnay is located on the Via Turonensis. one of the Ways of St. James some 45 km east by south-east of Surgères and 17 km north-east of Saint-Jean-d'Angély.

The commune invoices the village of La Cressoniere west of the town, Pinsenelle north-west of the town, and Salles-lès-Aulnay east of the town. Apart from the urban area of the town the commune is entirely farmland.

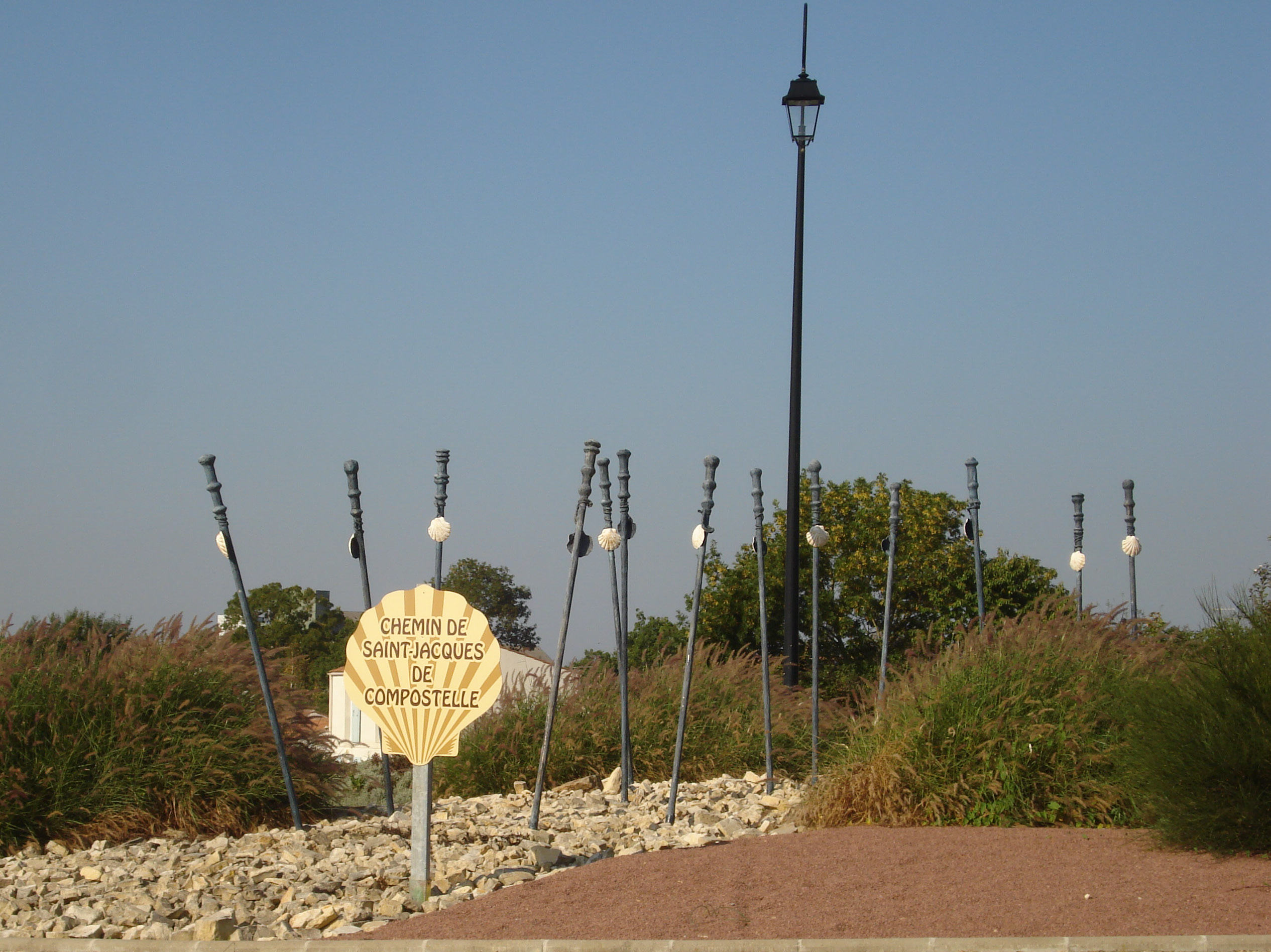
The entry to Aulnay on the D133 coming from Néré

=== Hydrography ===
The Brédoire river flows through the commune and the town from east to west to join the Boutonne at Nuaillé-sur-Boutonne. Although a small river the Brédoire flooded the town in December 1982. The Palud flows through the north of the commune from the east to join the Brédoire at La Cressoniere. The Saudrenne flows from the east in the south of the commune forming part of the southern border before continuing to join the Boutonne at Saint-Pardoult.

== History ==
=== Aulnay during the Roman Empire ===
Formerly called Aunedonnacum in the itinerary of Antoninus Pius and Auedonnaco in the Tabula Peutingeriana.

=== Aulnay in the Middle Ages ===
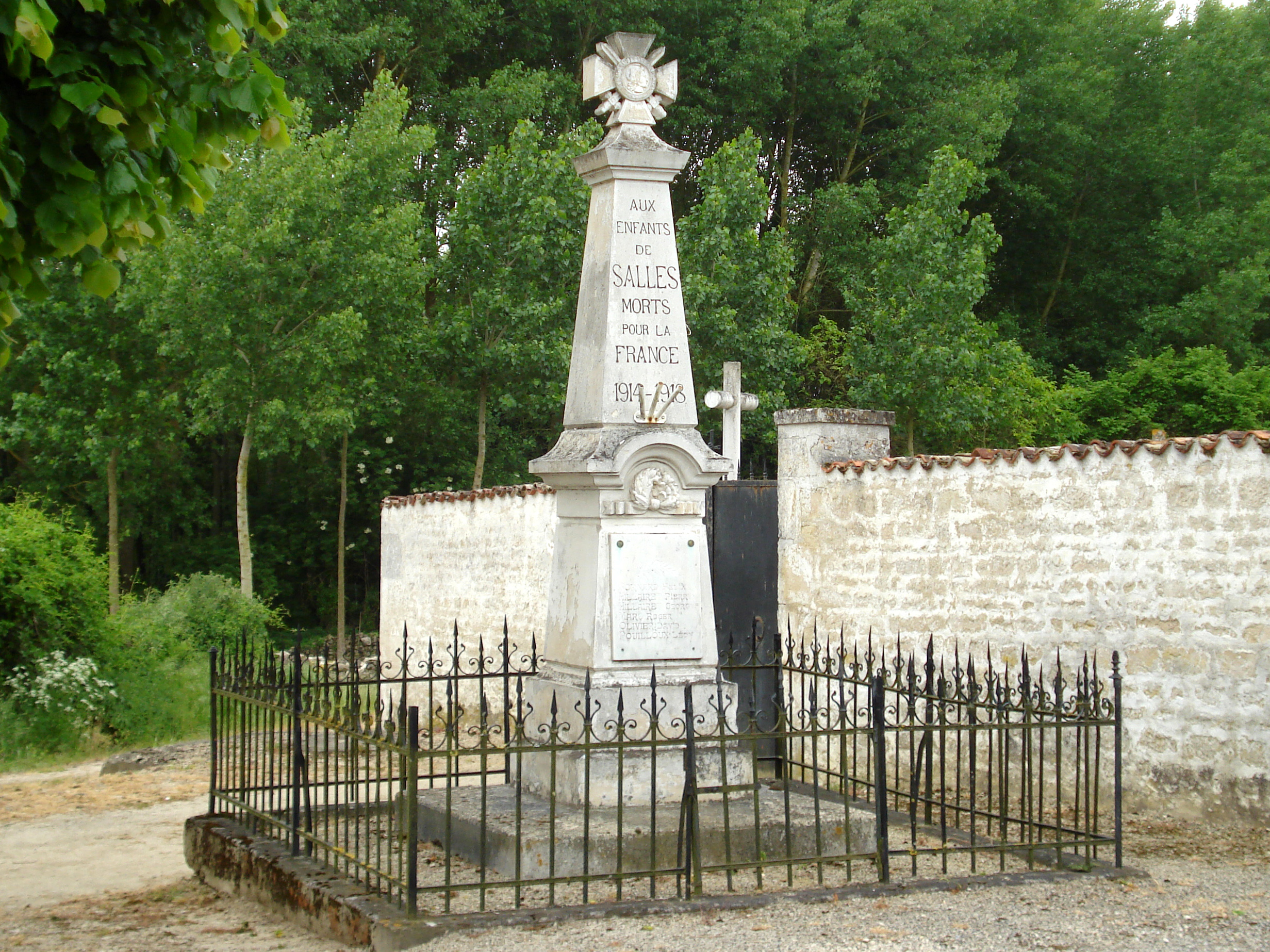
War memorial at Salles-lès-Aulnay

As the capital of a fiscal jurisdiction Aulnay was already the seat of a lordship in 925, as evidenced by the donation made by Cadelon I to several abbeys. The Viscounts of Aulnay (or Viscounts of Aunay) were descendants of other noble families in Poitou and Saintonge and lived in a castle which was demolished in 1818 but whose tower still remains.

=== Aulnay in the contemporary era ===
A common name for Aulnay is Aulnay-de-Saintonge but under the Ancien Régime Aulnay (often spelled Aunay) did not belong to the province of Saintonge but to the province of Poitou and the Diocese of Poitiers.

By decree dated 12 December 1973 the commune of Salles-lès-Aulnay merged with the commune of Aulnay.

Aulnay is the capital of the canton of Aulnay-de-Saintonge which has the largest extent in the department of Charente-Maritime.

=== Heraldry ===
Arms of Aulnay	Or, a pale the same between four lozenges of Gules posed in pale.

== Administration ==
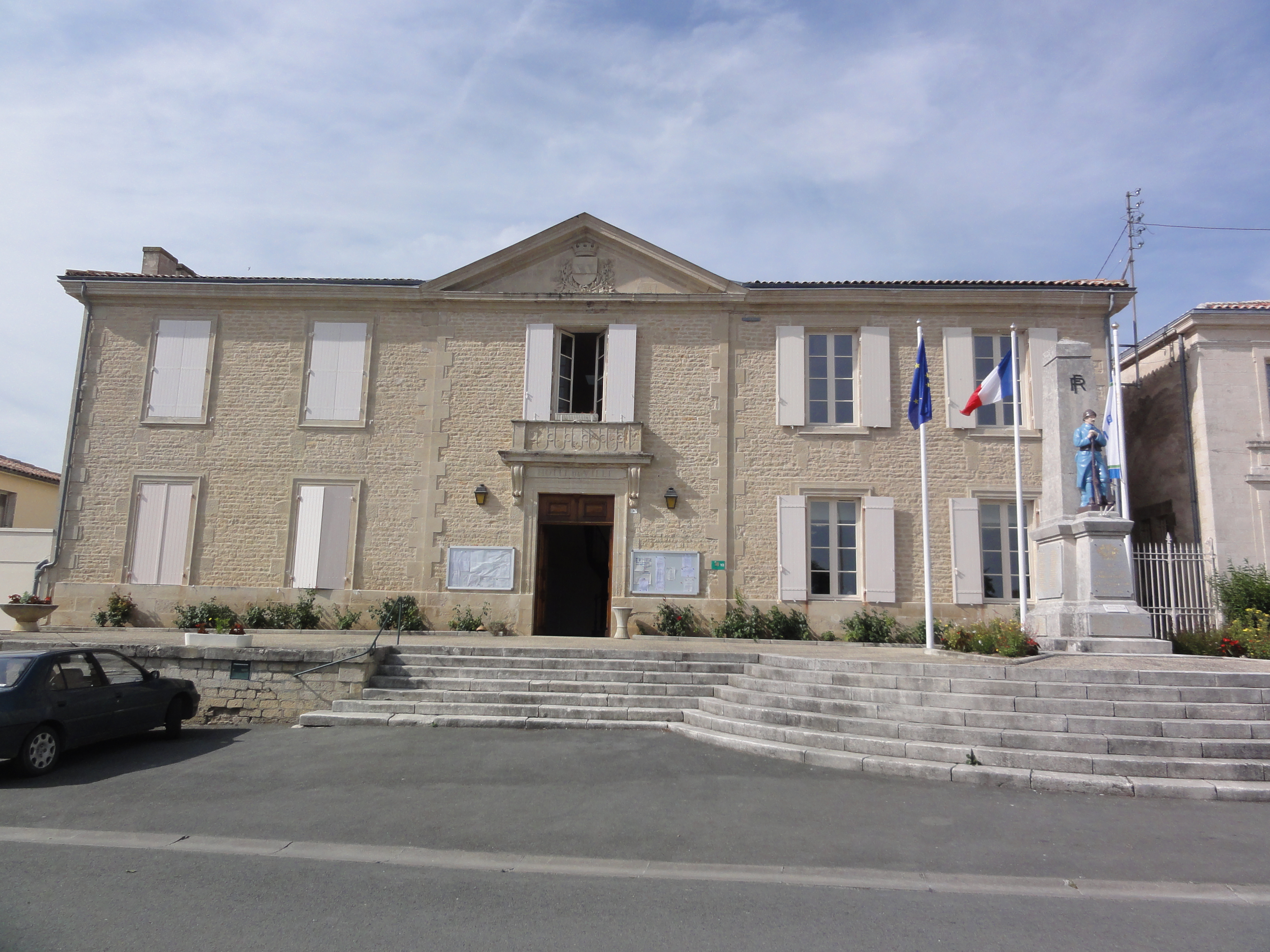
The Town Hall

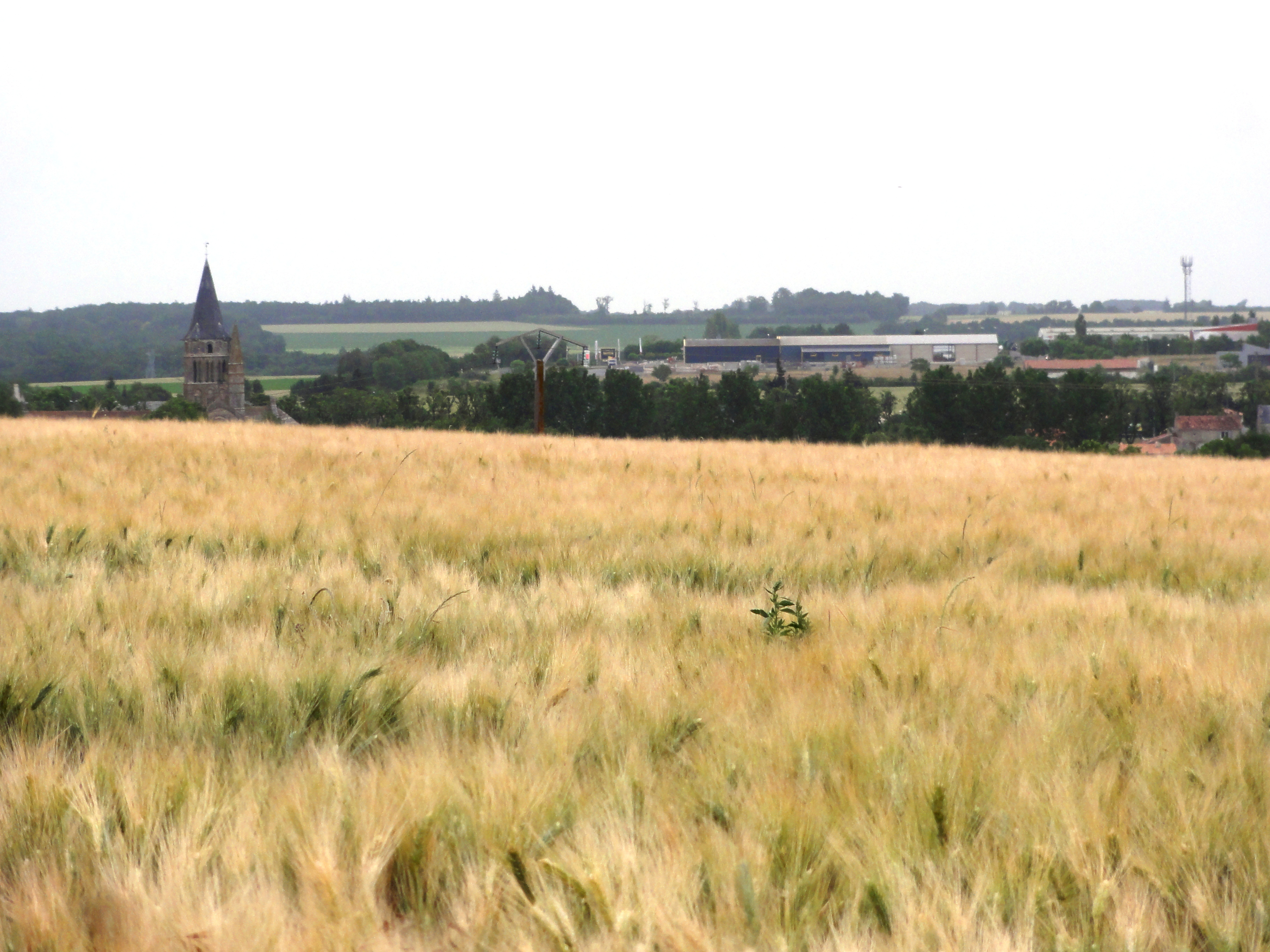
The countryside with the town in the background

List of Successive Mayors

From	To	Name
1920	1929	Roger Chapeaud
1933	1967	Roger Chapeaud
1967	1989	Pierre Chapeaud
1989	2001	Bernadette Guillard
2001	2014	Jean-Mary Collin
2014	2020	Charles Bellaud
2020	2026	Stéphane Chedouteaud

== Demography ==
The inhabitants of the commune are known as Aulnaysiens or Aulnaysiennes in French.

Historical population

Year	Pop.	±% p.a.
1793	1,301	—
1800	1,250	−0.57%
1806	1,368	+1.51%
1821	1,343	−0.12%
1831	1,525	+1.28%
1836	1,754	+2.84%
1841	1,750	−0.05%
1846	1,736	−0.16%
1851	1,809	+0.83%
1856	1,874	+0.71%
1861	2,005	+1.36%
1866	2,040	+0.35%
1872	1,980	−0.50%
1876	1,955	−0.32%
1881	1,950	−0.05%
1886	1,817	−1.40%
1891	1,780	−0.41%
1896	1,779	−0.01%
1901	1,675	−1.20%

Year	Pop.	±% p.a.
1906	1,540	−1.67%
1911	1,598	+0.74%
1921	1,443	−1.02%
1926	1,455	+0.17%
1931	1,436	−0.26%
1936	1,487	+0.70%
1946	1,404	−0.57%
1954	1,385	−0.17%
1962	1,471	+0.76%
1968	1,382	−1.03%
1975	1,509	+1.26%
1982	1,503	−0.06%
1990	1,462	−0.35%
1999	1,507	+0.34%
2007	1,462	−0.38%
2012	1,431	−0.43%
2017	1,369	−0.88%
2023	1,410	+0.49%

Source: EHESS and INSEE

== Culture and heritage ==
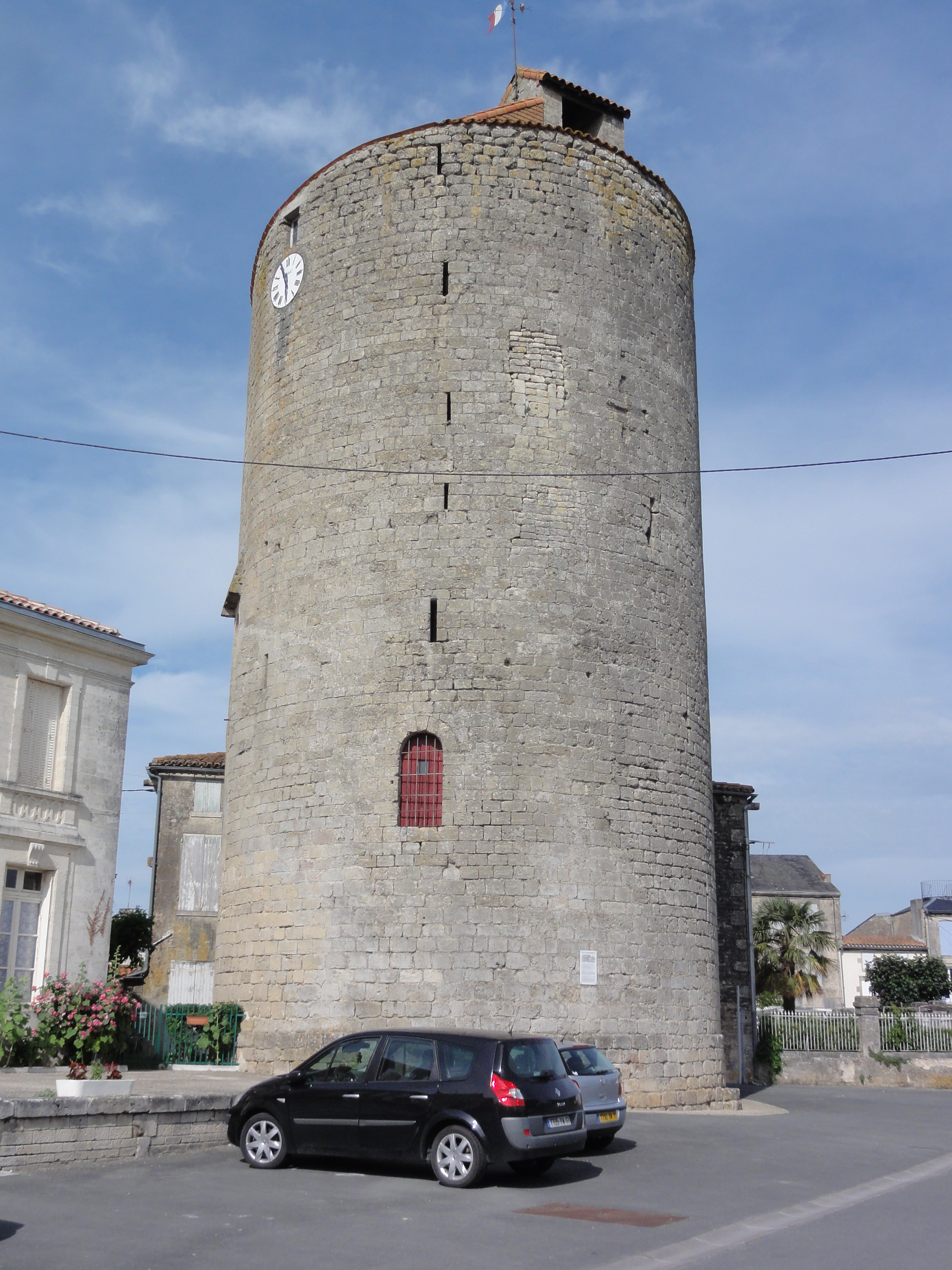
The Chateau Tower

=== Civil heritage ===
The commune has a number of buildings and structures that are registered as historical monuments:

- The Minargent Distillery (1910)
- A Chateau (13th century)
- A Dairy Factory (1926)

=== Religious heritage ===
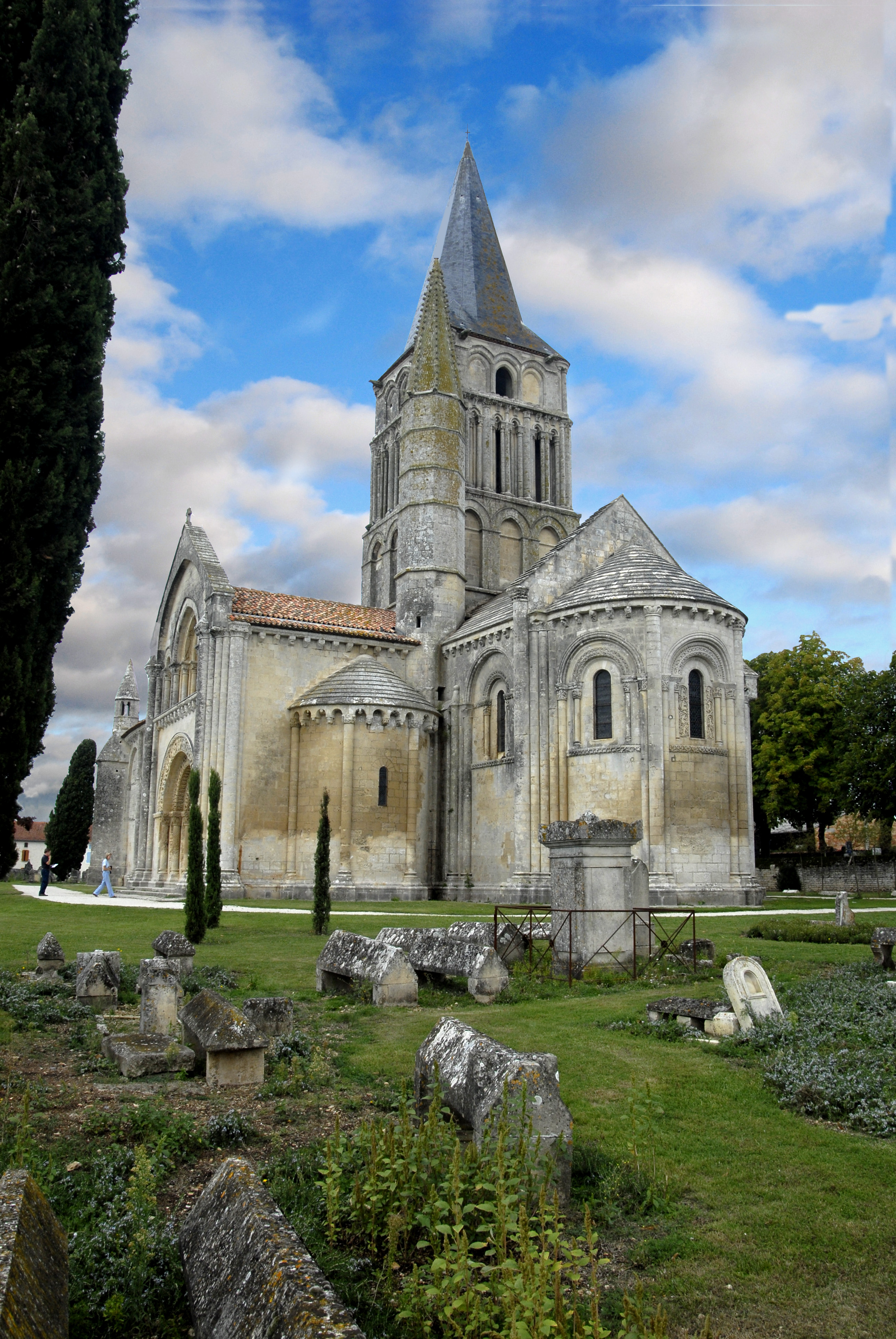
The Church of Saint-Pierre d'Aulnay

The commune has several religious buildings and structures that are registered as historical monuments:

- A Cemetery Cross (14th century)
- The Church of Saint-Pierre d'Aulnay (12th century). One of the finest surviving Romanesque churches. It is also classified as a UNESCO World Heritage Site. It is unknown why the church was built so far from the town but it may be related to the site of an old cemetery along the Roman road. At the end of the 11th century the building that preceded it belonged to the Abbey of Saint-Cyprien in Poitiers who, around 1045, received part of the burial rights and wax offerings from the church as evidenced by a donation by Ranulfe Rabiole. Pierre II, Bishop of Poitiers, around 1100 confirmed the ownership of the church by the monastery and Pope Calixtus II followed his example in 1119. In 1135 however, the parish belonged to the Chapter of Poitiers Cathedral which retained its rights until the French Revolution. Papal bulls dated 1149 and 1157 list the Aulnay church in the list of properties of Canons who were calculating their costs. The church is particularly famous for the early-twelfth-century sculpture on its south and west doorways; it is among the most often discussed examples of this form of Romanesque art. Numerous oriental influences can be seen in its designs. For example, the first arc of one doorway is said to be inspired by Oriental designs. Designs of elephants also originate from Oriental designs. The Church contains several items that are registered as historical objects:
  - A Painting: Christ with doctors (17th century)
  - A Statue: Saint Peter as Pope (15th century)
  - A Stoup (12th century)
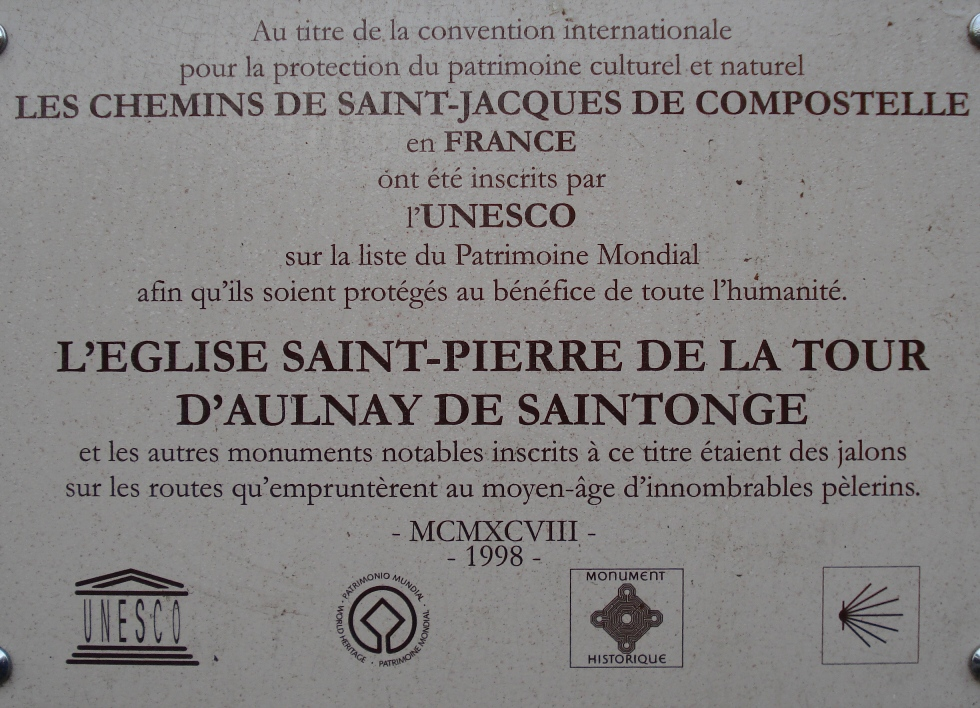
UNESCO plaque

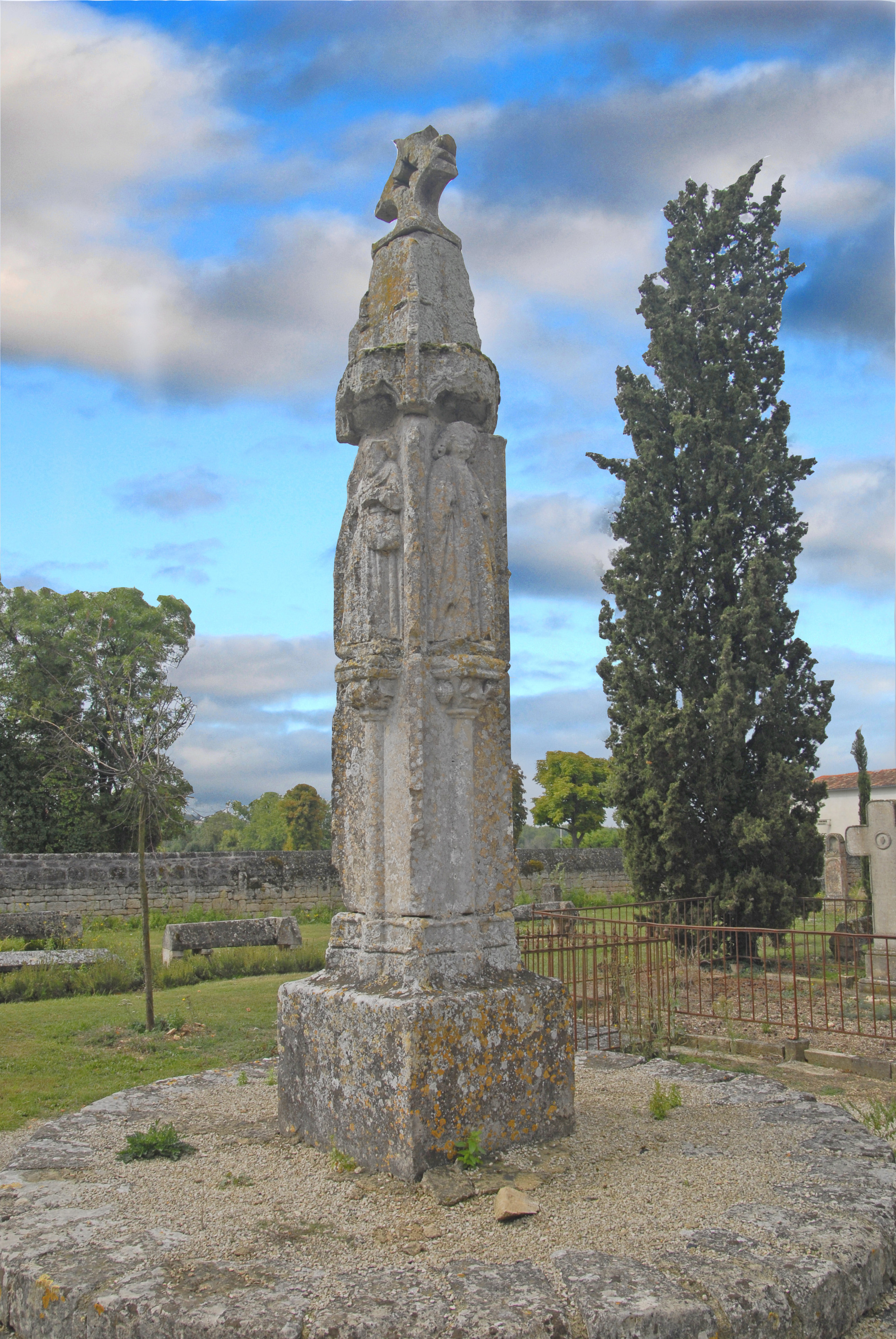
The Cemetery Cross

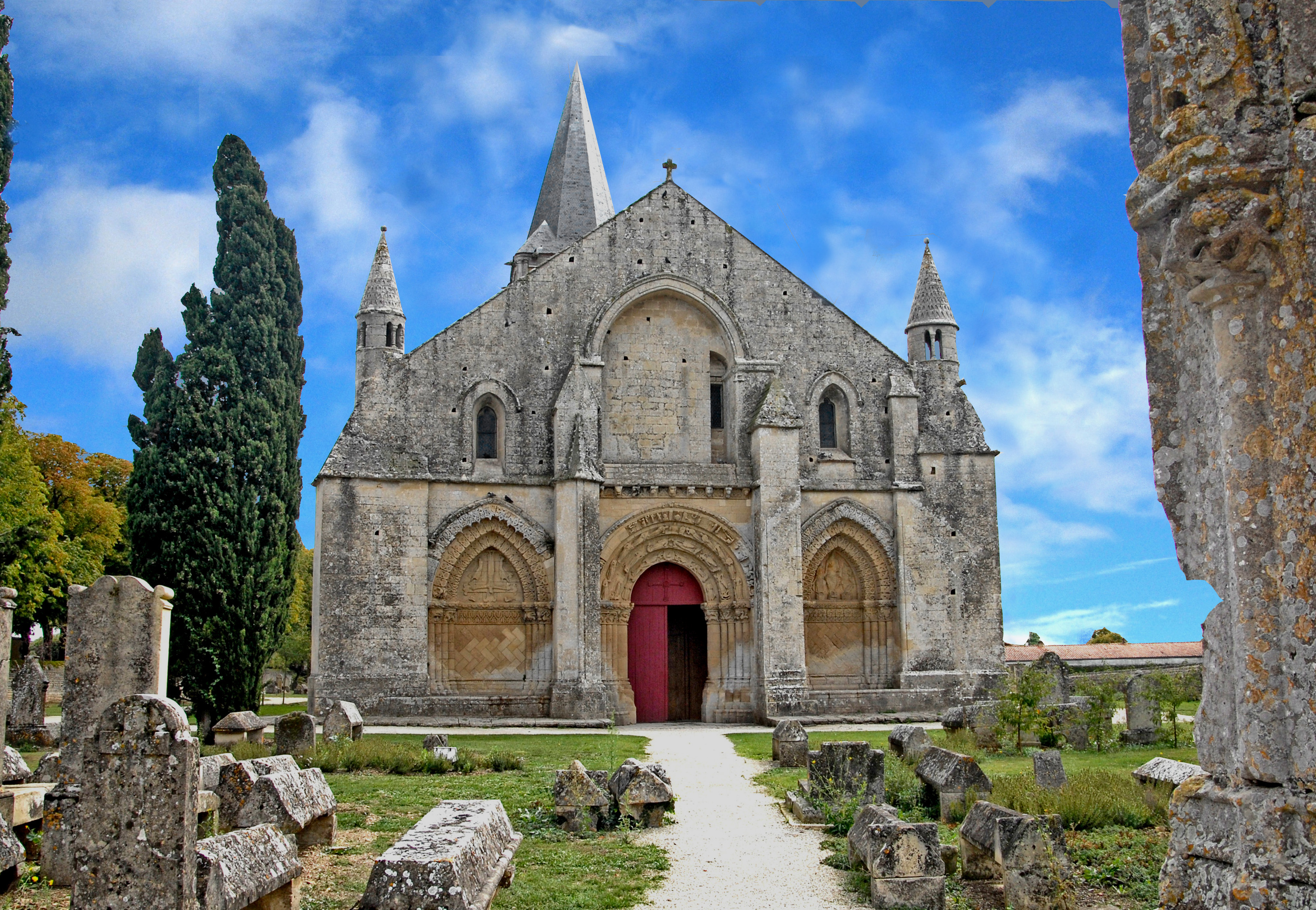
The front of the church

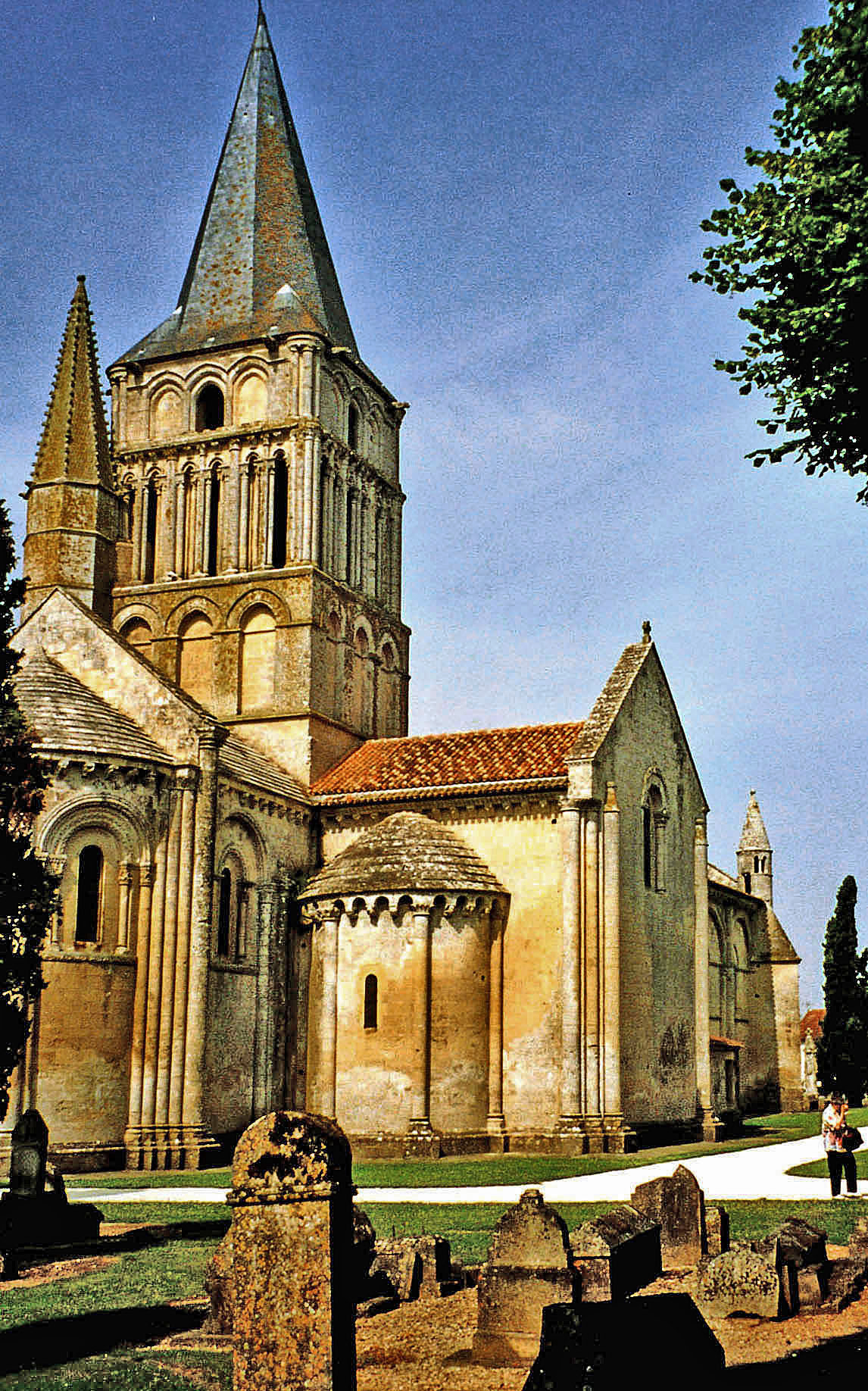
The Church of Saint-Pierre

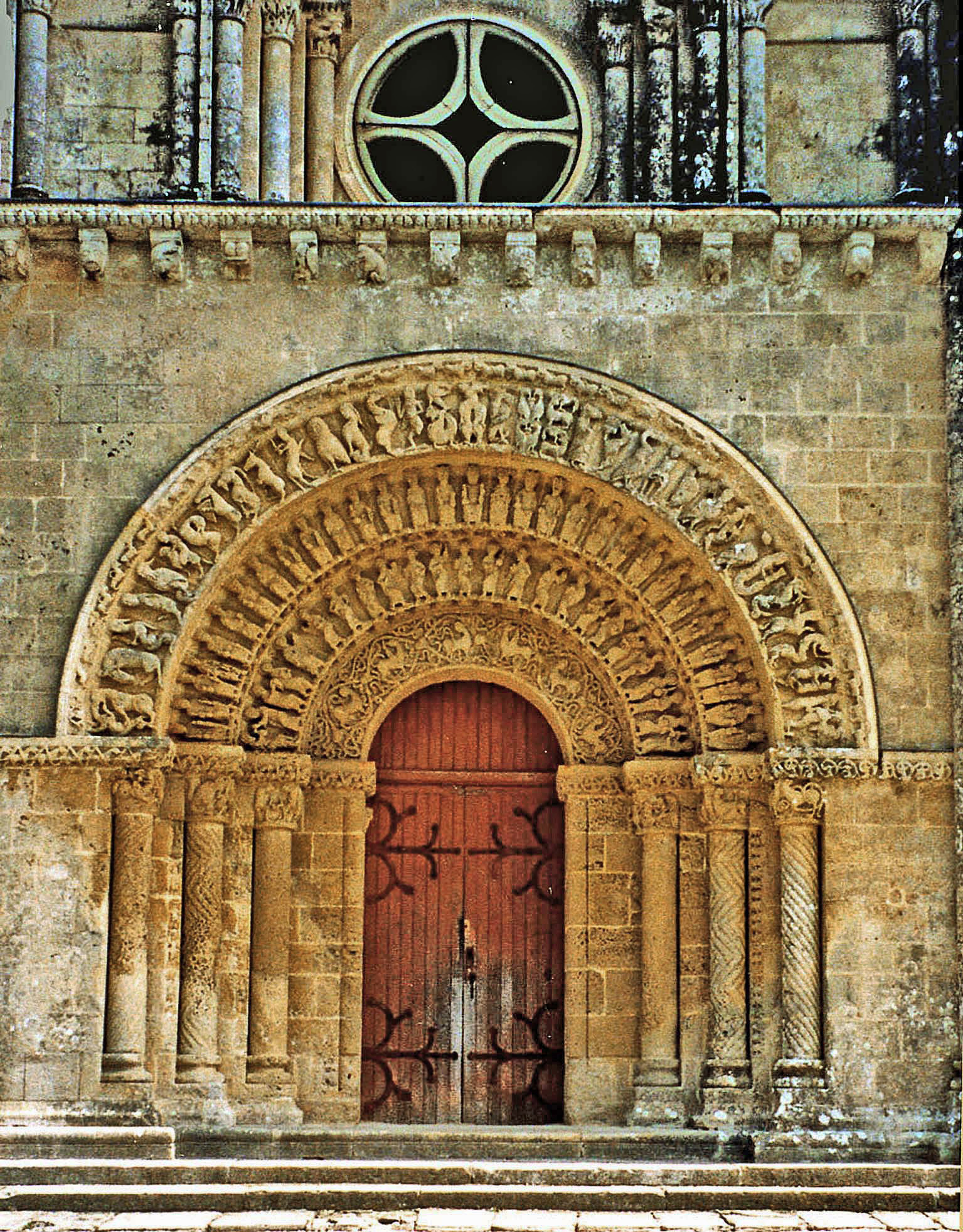
The south entrance to the Church

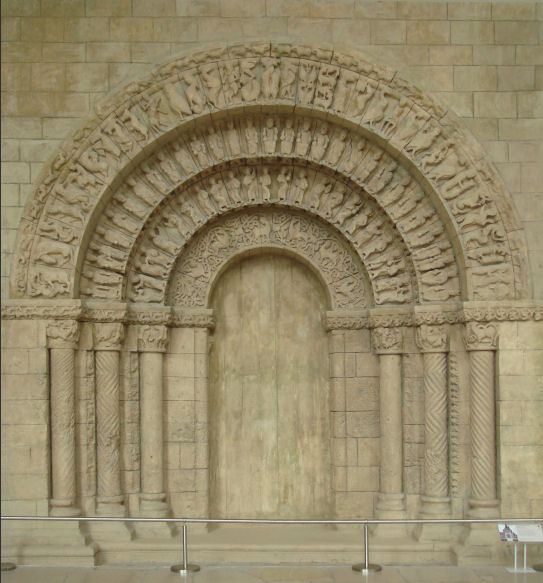
Portal of Eglise Saint-Pierre, Aulnay-de-Saintonge, mid-12th century.

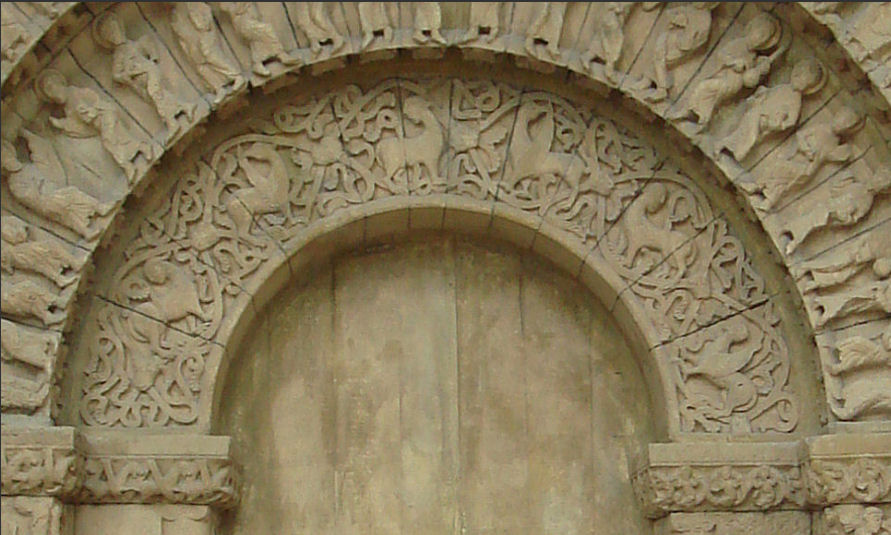
Islamic stylistic influence in the Church of Saint-Pierre.

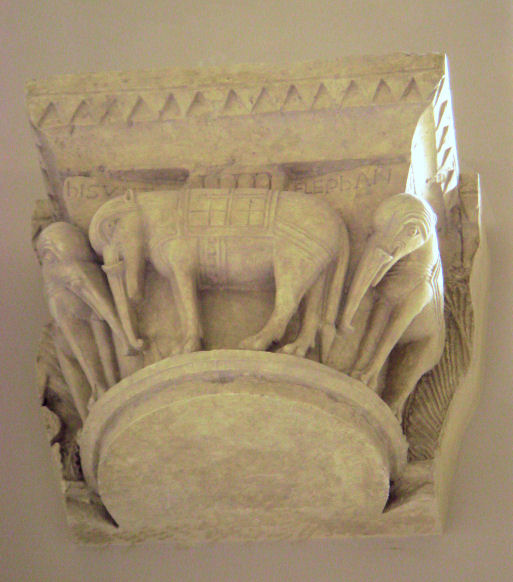
Capital with elephants on the Church

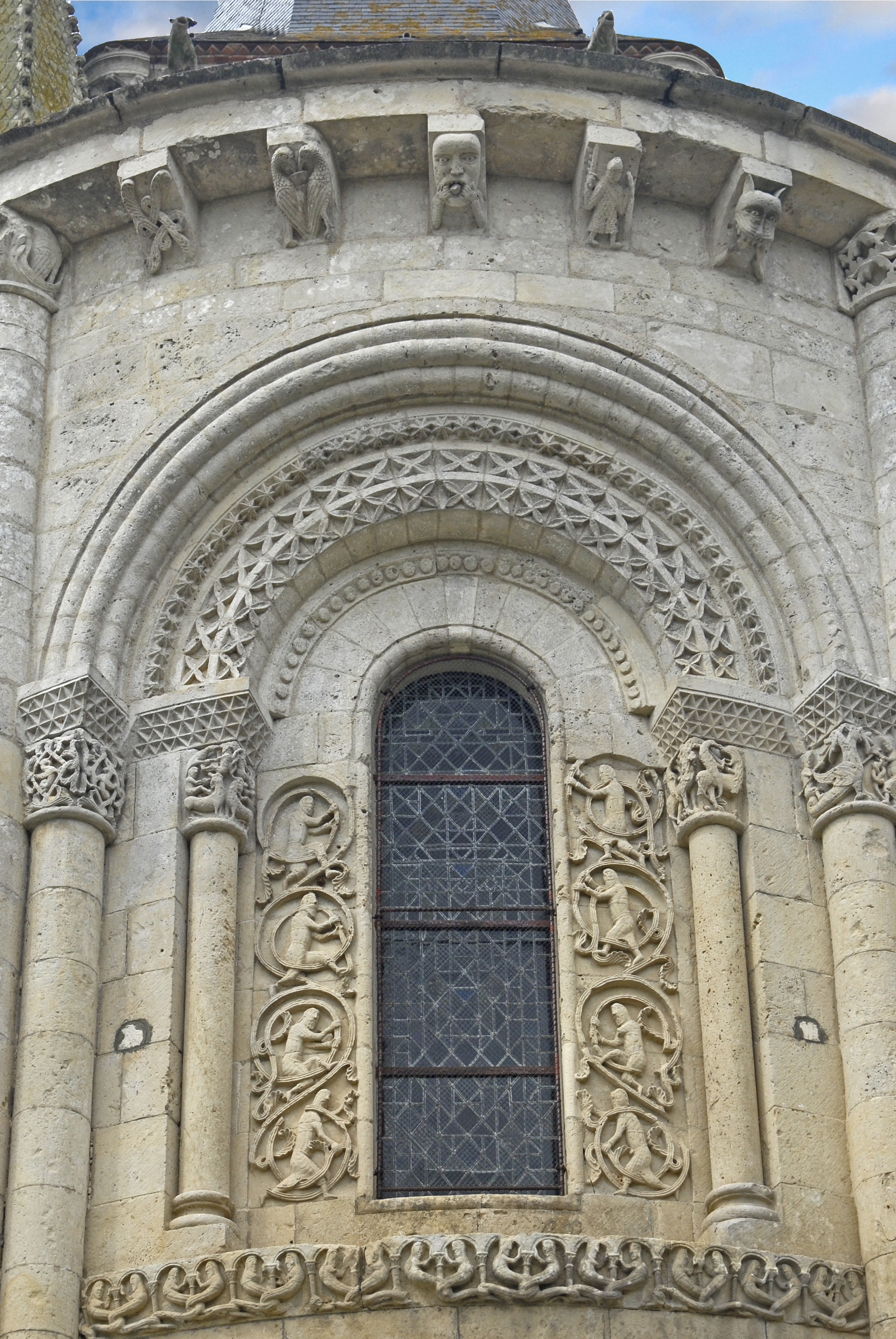
A Church window

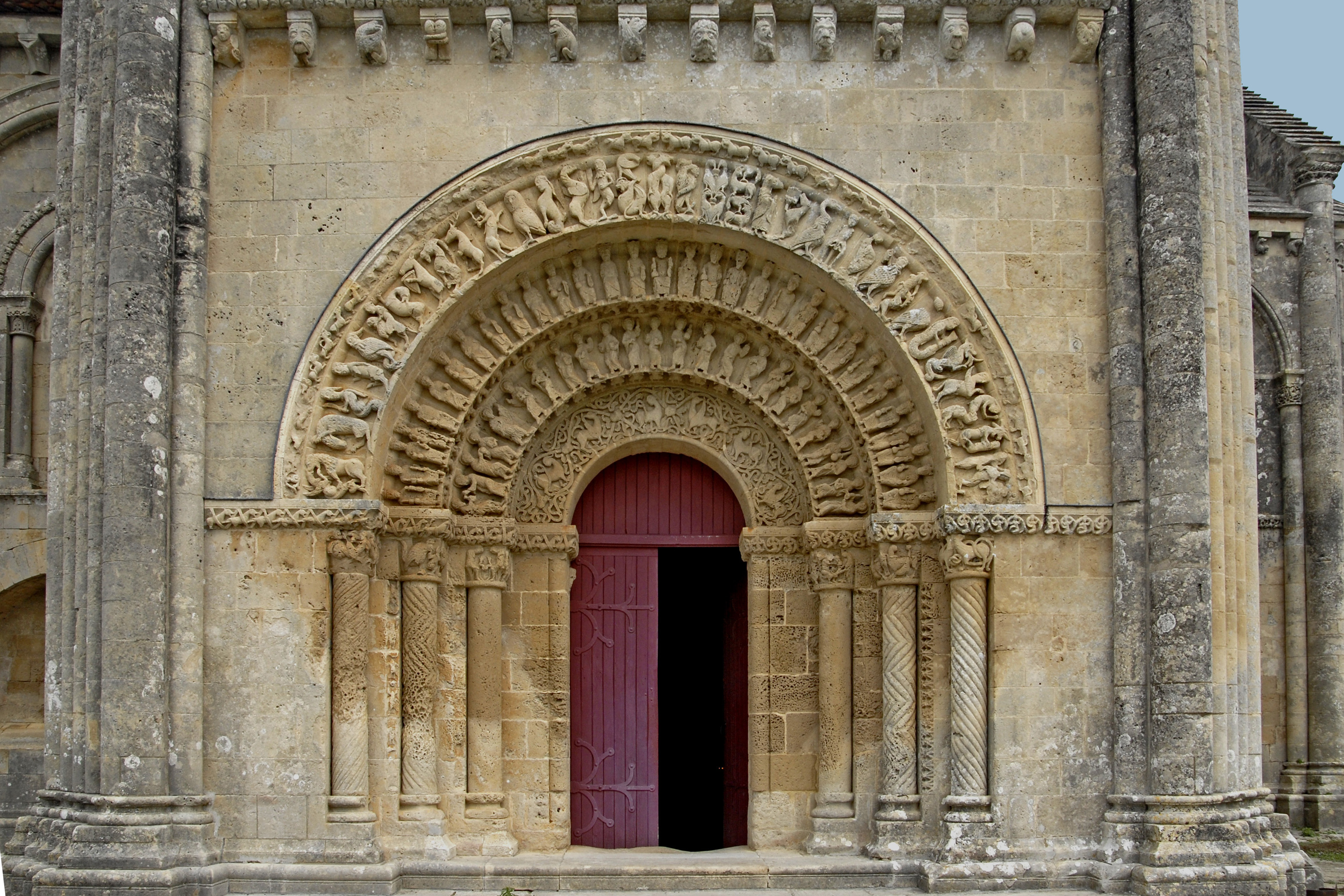
The south side of the Church

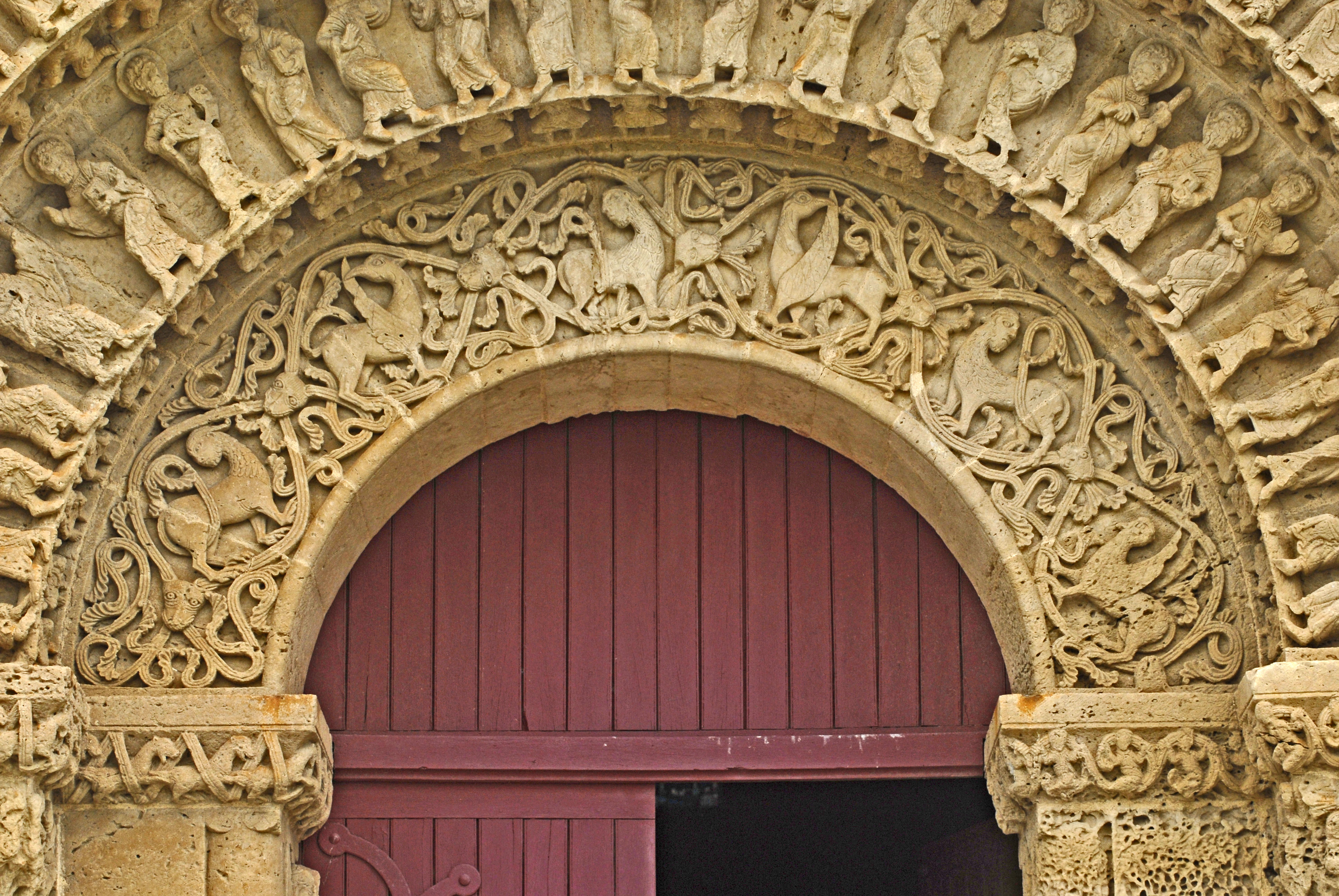
Detail of the south side

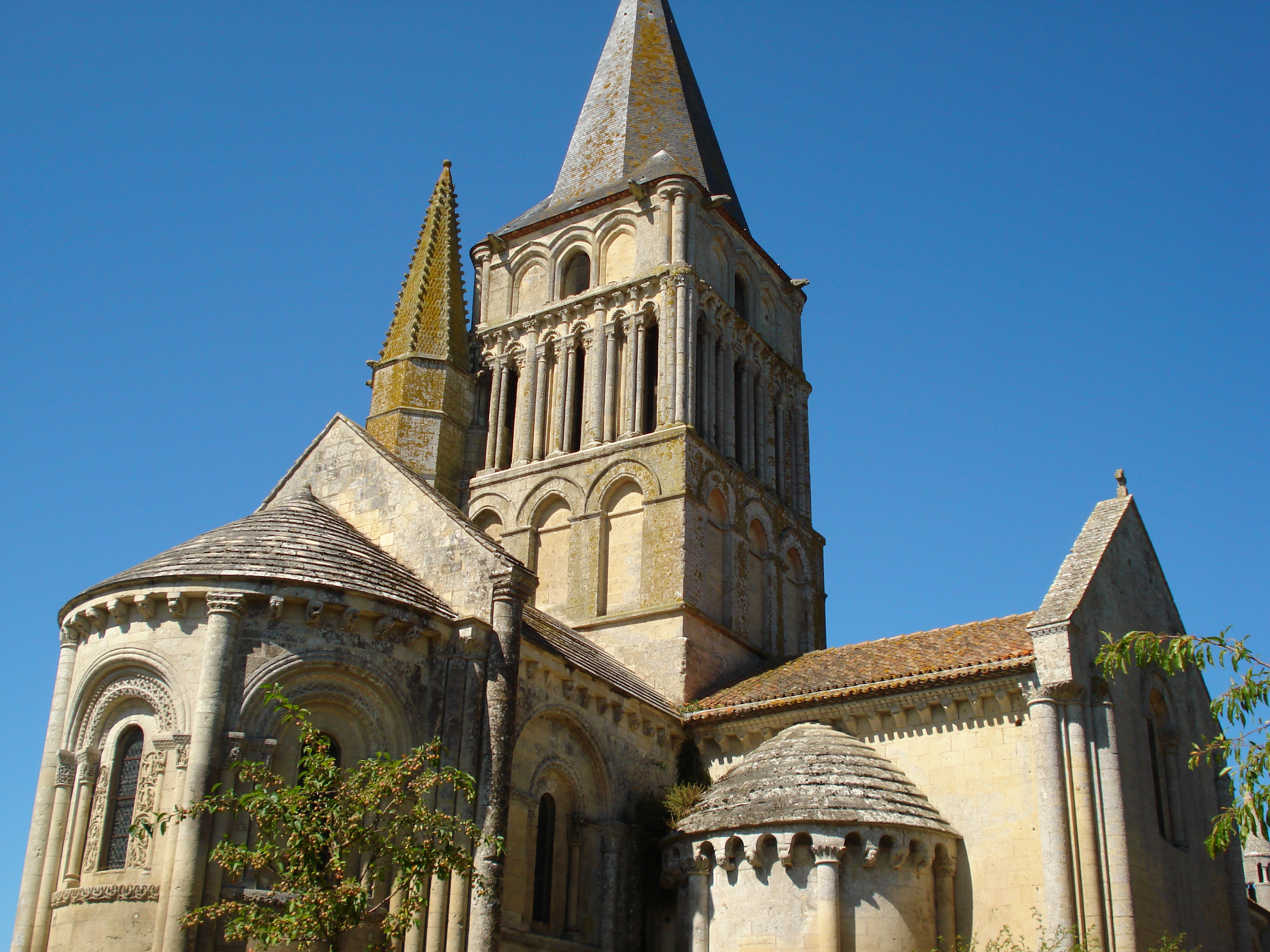
The Bell Tower

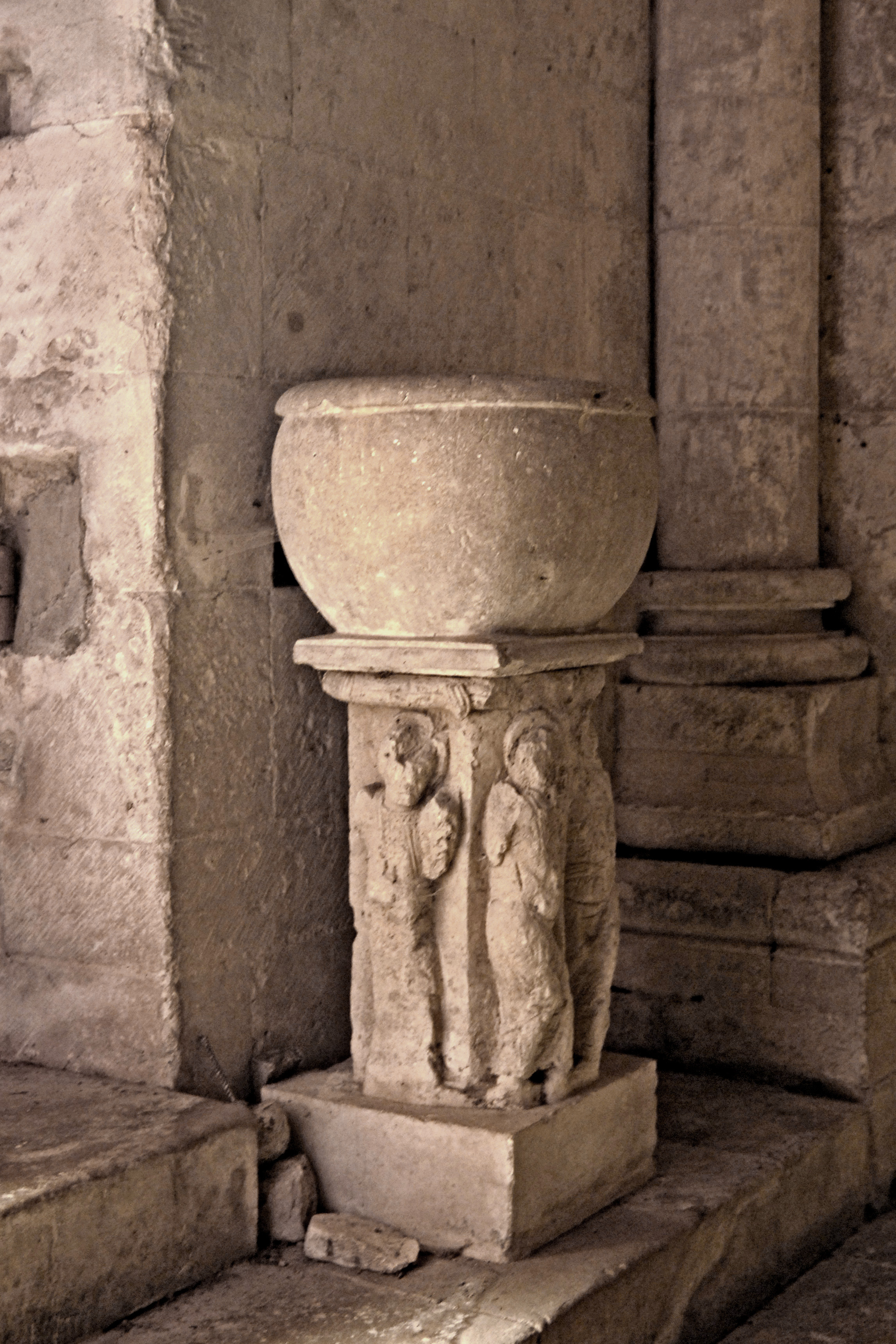
The Stoup

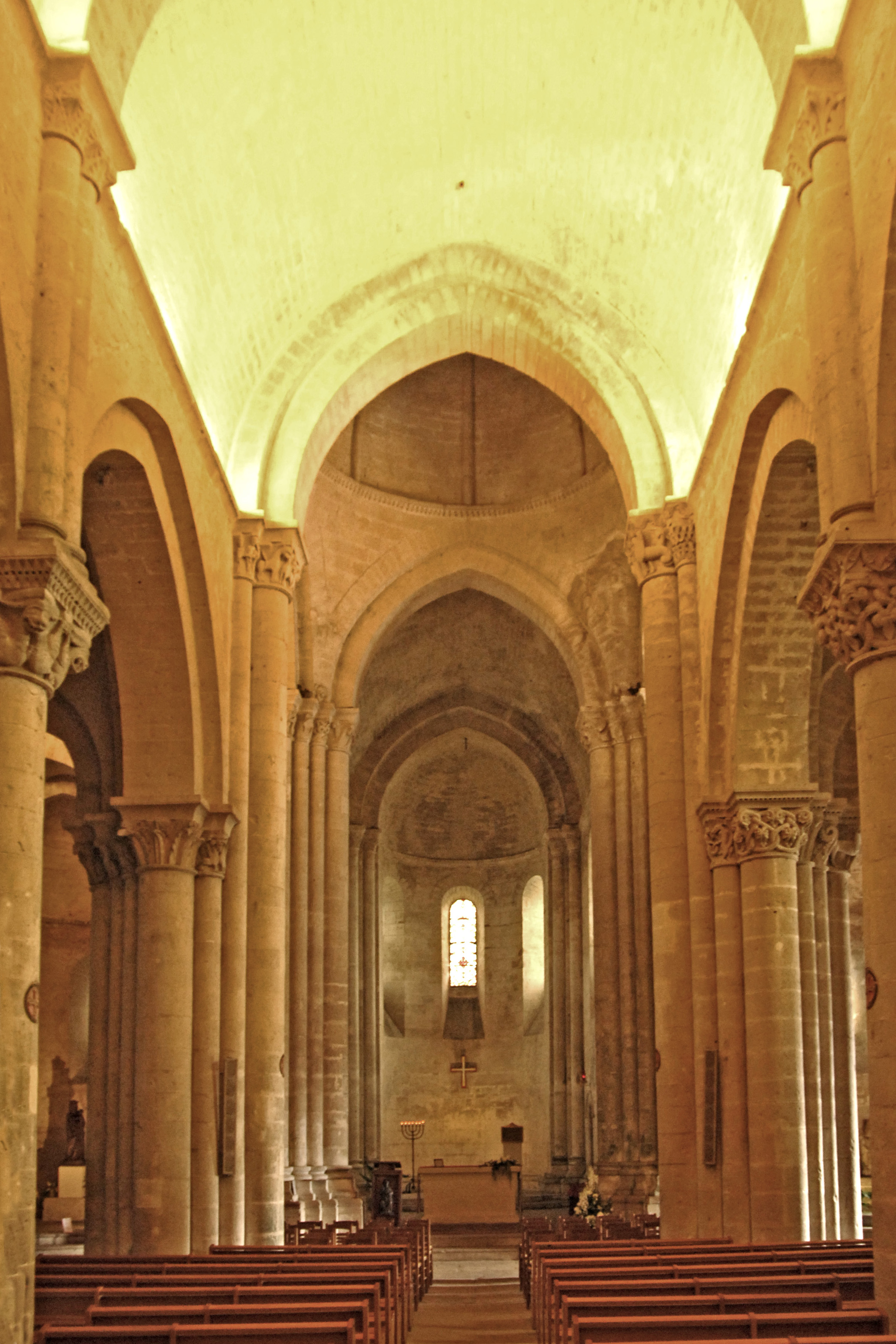
The Nave of the Church

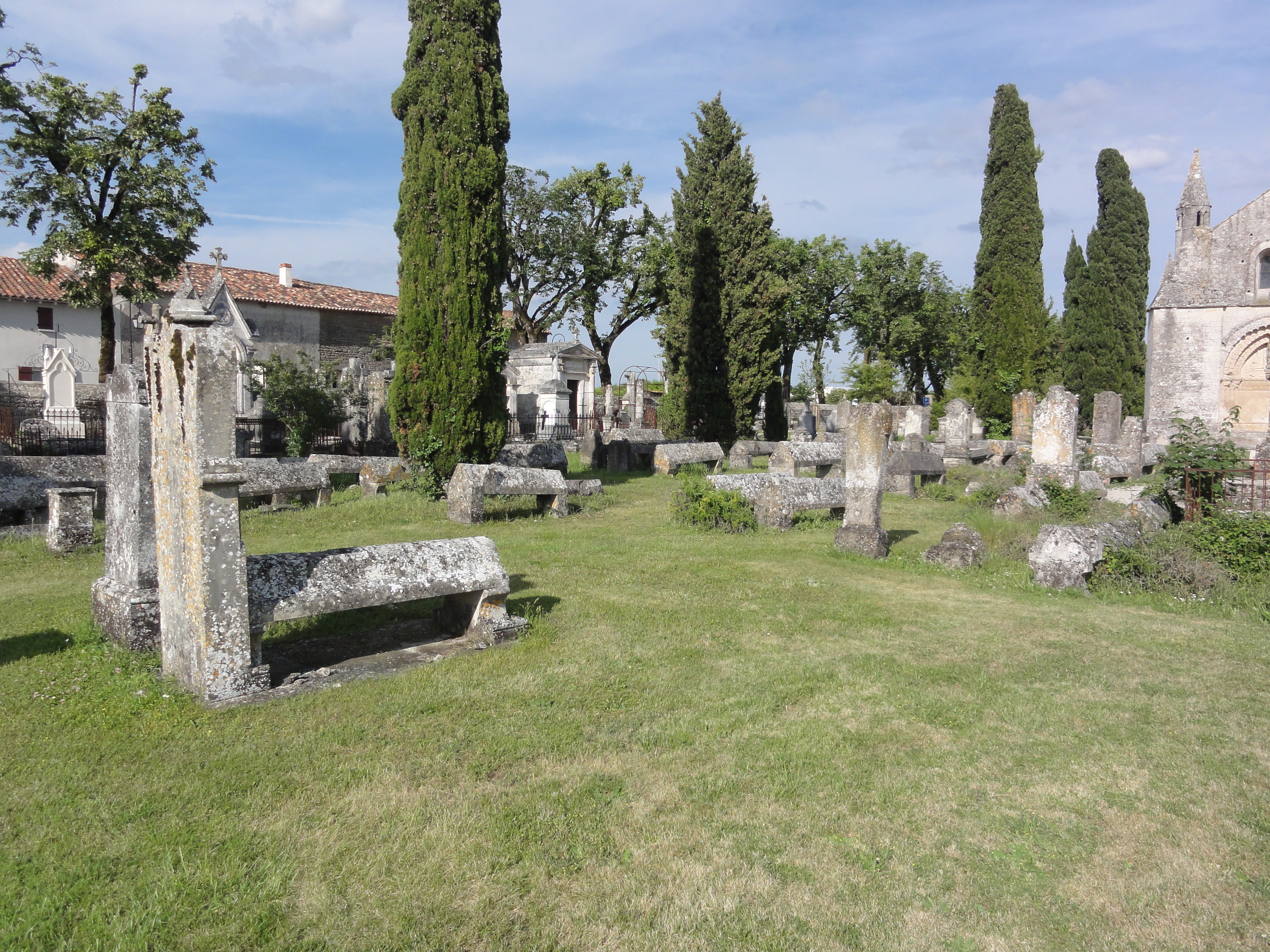
The cemetery next to the Church
- The Church of Notre-Dame (12th century) The Church contains one item that is registered as an historical object:
  - A Baptismal font (12th century)
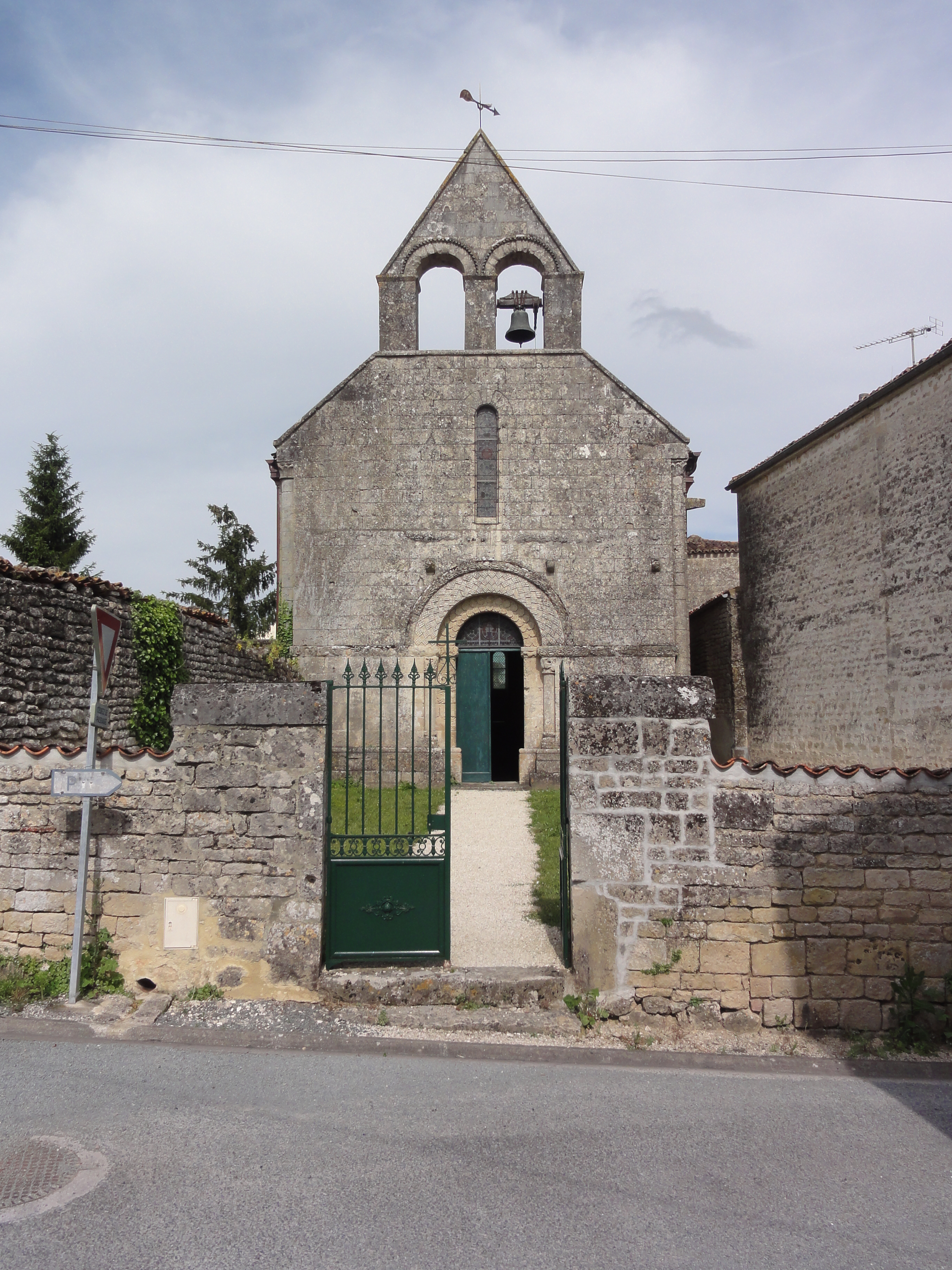
The Church of Notre-Dame

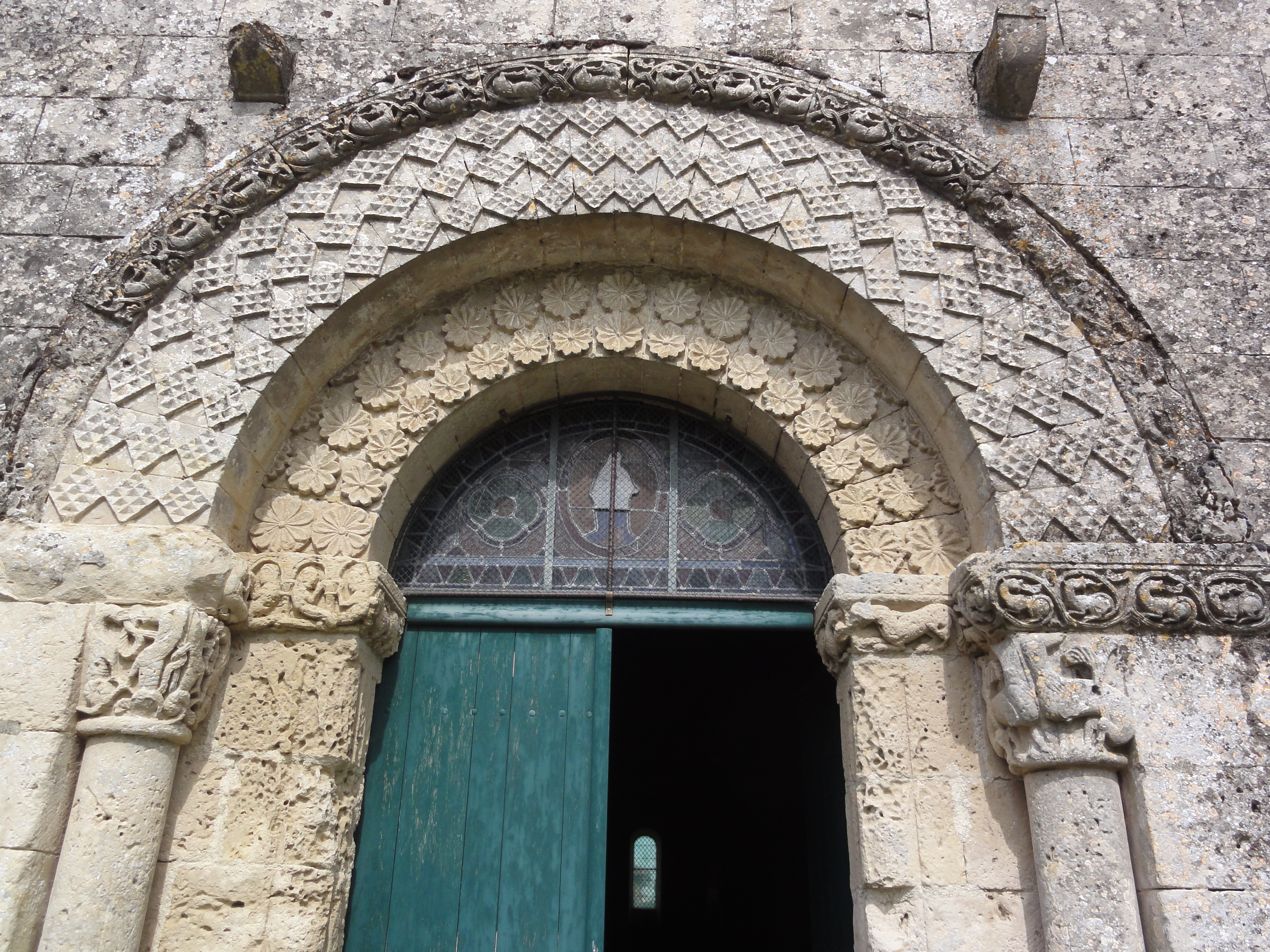
Church of Notre-Dame entrance

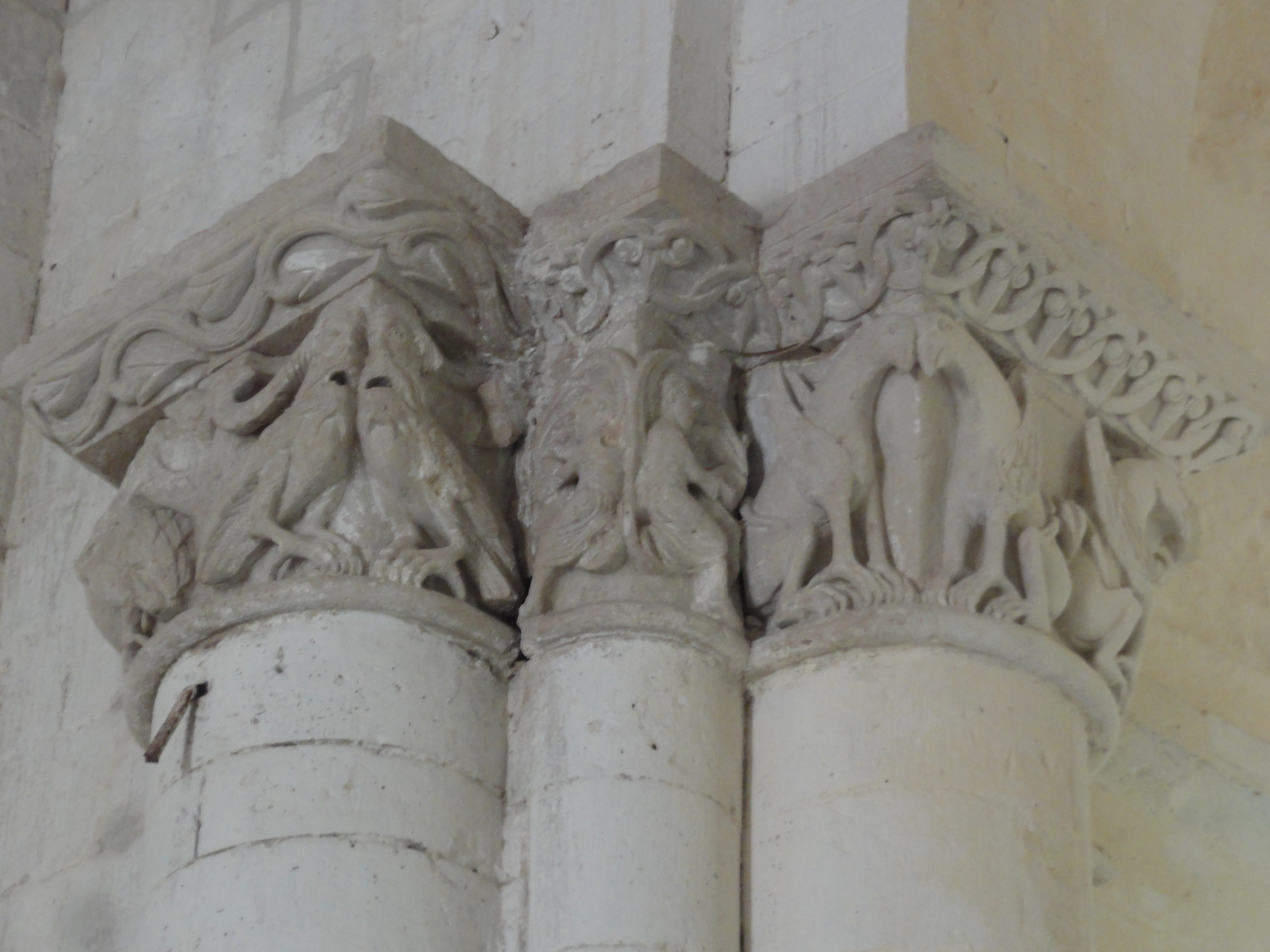
Capitals in the Church of Notre-Dame

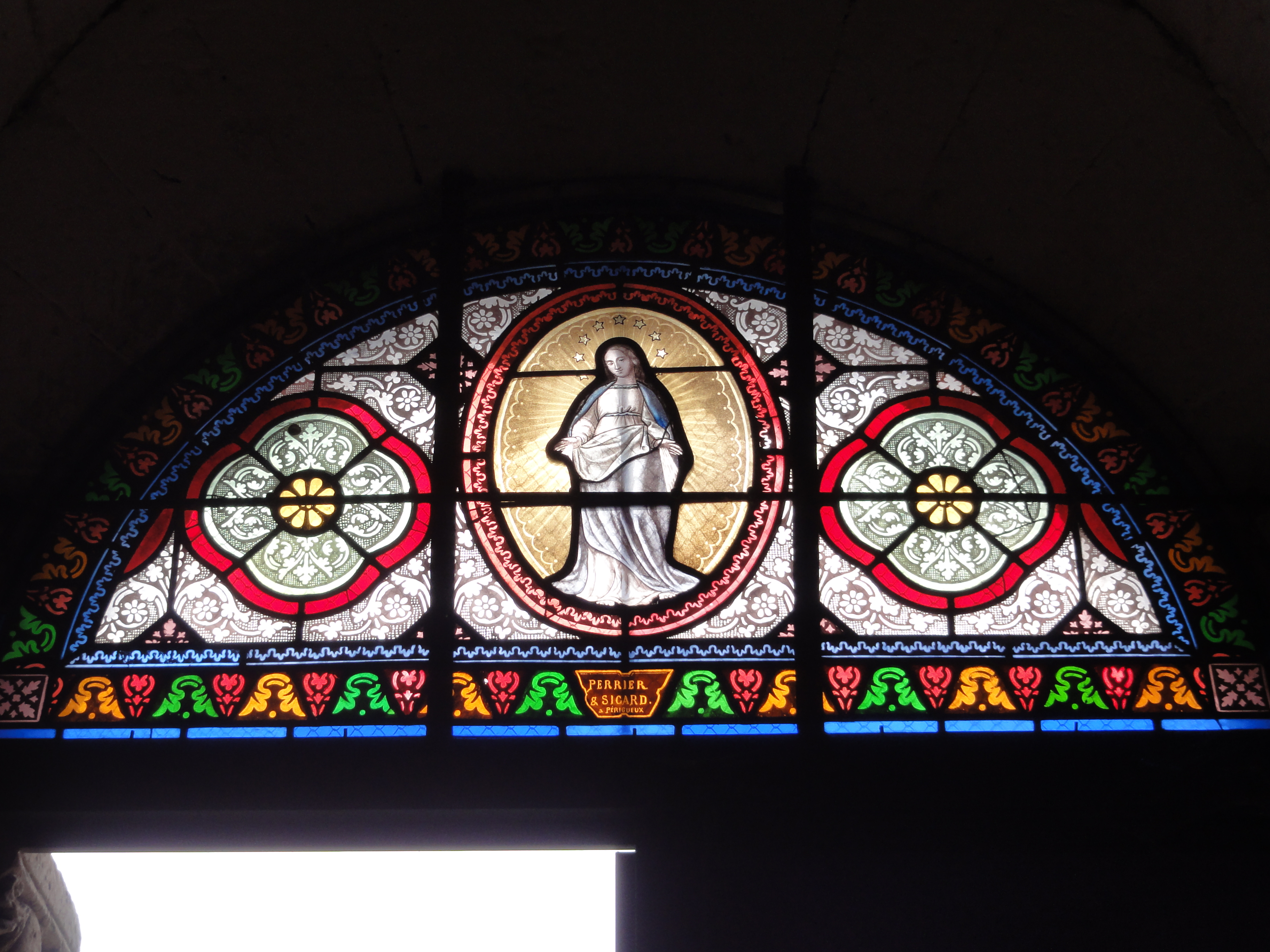
Stained glass in the Church of Notre-Dame

== Sports ==
Football is the main sport of the commune with a regional club which in 1976 was the winner of the Challenge Central-West.

== See also ==
- Communes of the Charente-Maritime department

=== External links ===
- Aulnay on the Community of communes website
- art-roman.net Photos of Aulnay
- romanes.com Photos of Aulnay
- Aulnay on Géoportail, National Geographic Institute (IGN) website (in French)
- Aunay on the 1750 Cassini Map
