= Church of Saint-Pierre d'Aulnay =

Church in Nouvelle-Aquitaine, France

Coordinates: 46°01′23″N 0°21′19″W

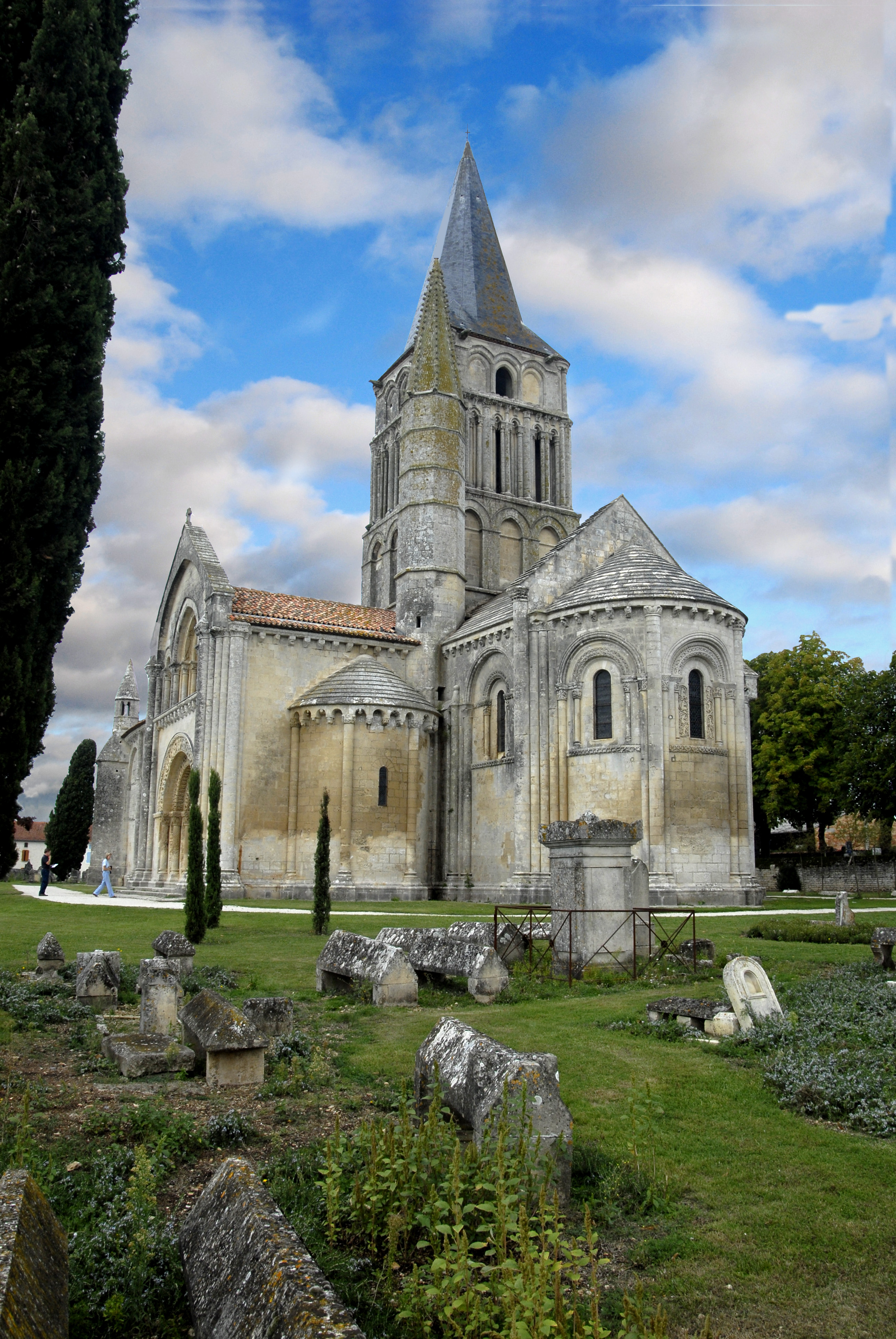
Church of Saint-Pierre-de-la-Tour d'Aulnay.

The Church of Saint-Pierre d'Aulnay (French: Église Saint-Pierre d'Aulnay) is an important medieval church on the way to Saint-Jacques de Compostelle, in Aulnay, Charente-Maritime. The Church is thought to have been built in 1120–1140.

Numerous oriental influences can be seen in its designs. For example, the first arc of the gate is inspired from Oriental designs. Designs of elephants also find their origin in Oriental designs.

Numerous mouldings of the Church are visible at the Cité de l'Architecture et du Patrimoine in Paris.

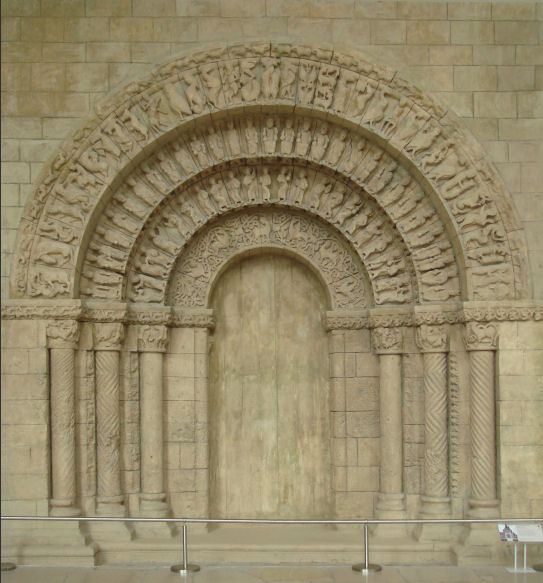
Portal of Eglise Saint-Pierre, Aulnay-de-Saintonge, mid 12th century.

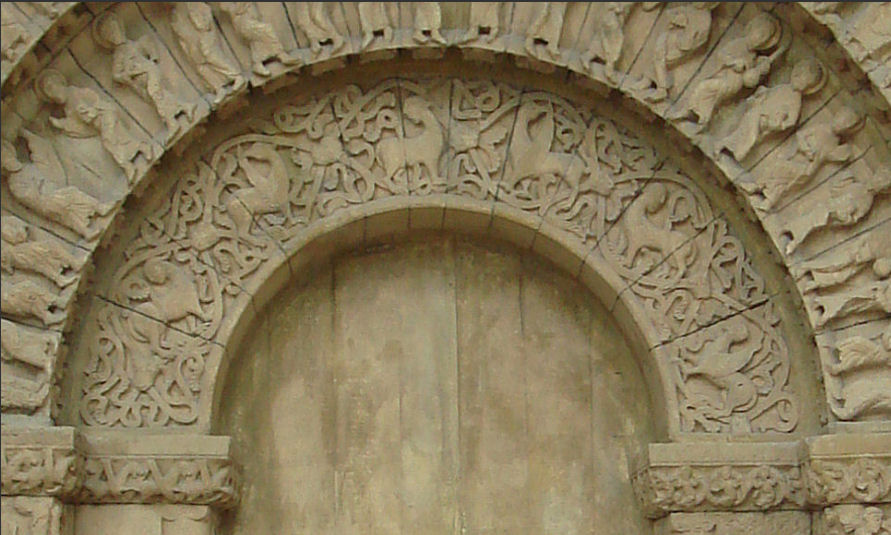
Oriental stylistic influence on the first arc of the gate of the church, Aulnay-de-Saintonge, mid 12th century.

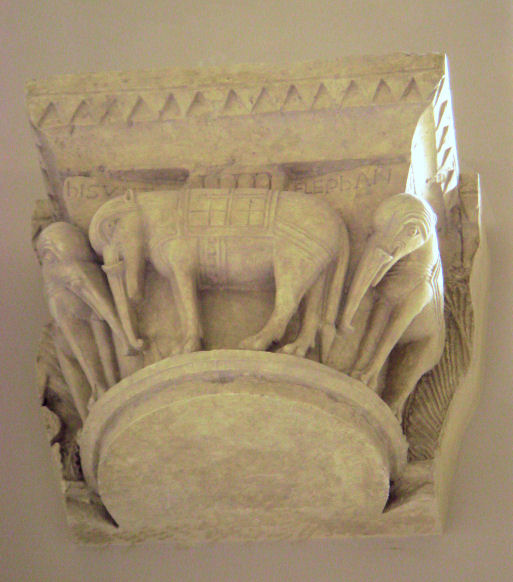
Capital with elephants, Eglise Saint-Pierre, Aulnay-de-Saintonge, mid 12th century.
